= Pete Hegseth as Secretary of Defense =

Department head under Donald Trump (2025–present)

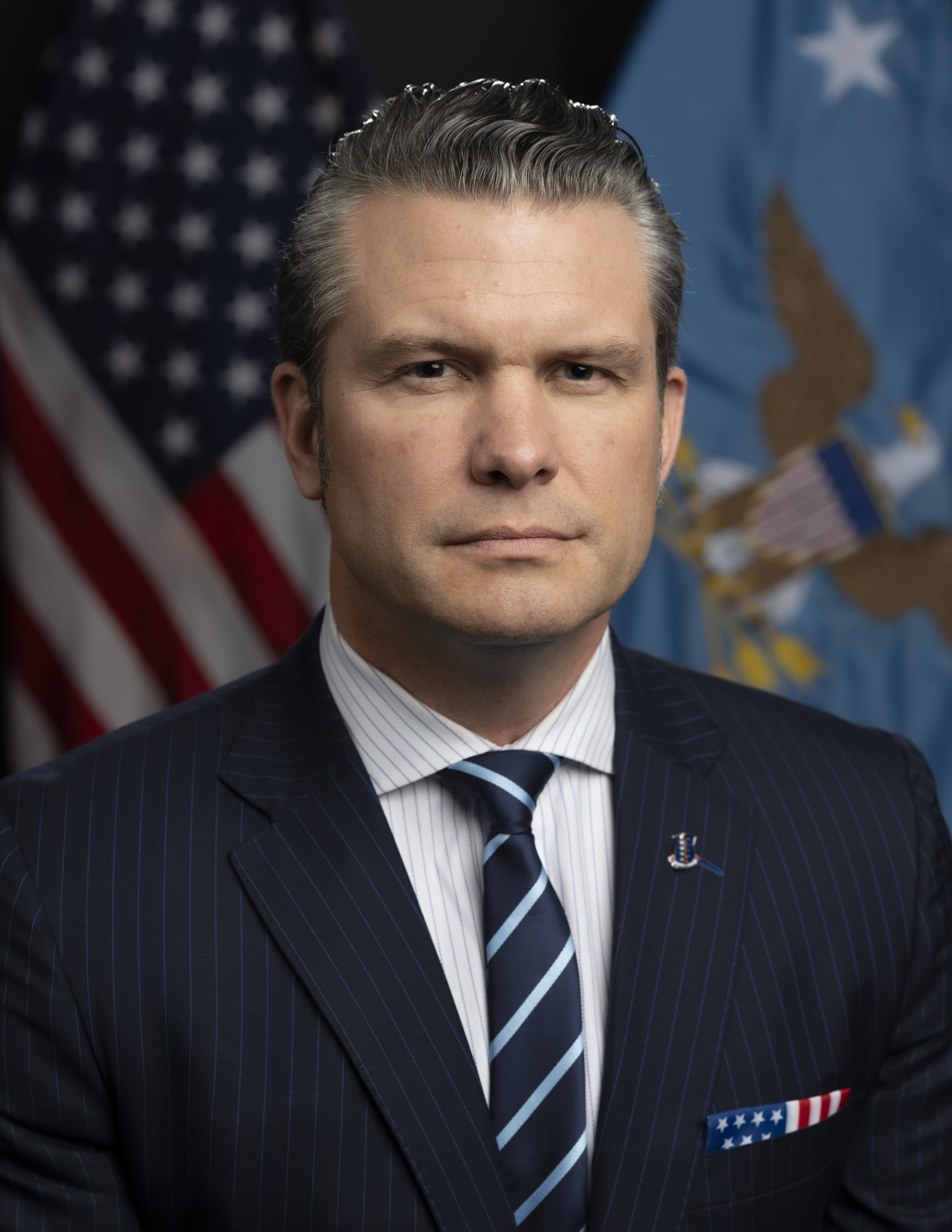
- Official portrait, 2025
- Pete Hegseth as Secretary of Defense; January 25, 2025 – present
- Party: Republican
- Nominated by: Donald Trump
- Seat: The Pentagon
- Seal of the United States Secretary of Defense

Pete Hegseth has served as the United States secretary of defense since 2025.

== History ==
=== Nomination and confirmation ===
Hegseth testifying at his confirmation hearing before the Senate Committee on Armed Services on January 14, 2025

On November 12, 2024, President-elect Donald Trump named Hegseth as his nominee for secretary of defense, after Arkansas senator Tom Cotton announced he would not serve as secretary. Hegseth subsequently ended his contract with Fox News. The selection of Hegseth was seen as a sign that Trump sought to appoint a loyalist to lead the Department of Defense, (Note: Attributed to multiple references:) and his relative lack of experience surprised officials in the department. (Note: Attributed to multiple references:) According to Vanity Fair, Trump's transition team became aware the following day of a sexual assault allegation involving Hegseth that occurred in Monterey, California, seven years prior; The Washington Post reported that senior officials on the team were surprised by the allegation and reconsidered his nomination. Despite the allegation, Trump defended Hegseth and several Republican senators indicated that they would support him. His nomination was threatened by an article from Jane Mayer in The New Yorker detailing alleged financial mismanagement and alcohol issues while leading his veterans' groups, while an NBC News article reported that his drinking habits concerned his colleagues at Fox News; The New York Times reported in December that Trump had begun to consider Florida governor Ron DeSantis as an alternative.

To retain his nomination amid controversy, Hegseth began a campaign that month. Advisors to Trump privately sought to persuade him to support Hegseth in fear that it would embolden recalcitrant Republican senators, while he could not garner support for DeSantis, according to The New York Times. In addition, the Times reported that Vice President-elect JD Vance had led a group of Republicans, including Donald Trump Jr., former Trump aide Steve Bannon, political activist Charlie Kirk, and Breitbart News reporter Matt Boyle, to support Hegseth's nomination. Trump allies took a direct approach to addressing the controversies, including an interview with Megyn Kelly that impressed Trump. Hegseth appeared at the United States Capitol in December; Trump publicly reaffirmed his support for Hegseth afterwards. The visit gave Iowa senator Joni Ernst, who had threatened his nomination, a positive impression of Hegseth.

Hegseth appeared before the Senate Committee on Armed Services on January 14. He positioned himself as a "warrior" while denying the allegations and his previous claims that women should not serve in combat roles. Hegseth was criticized by Democrats over allegations of sexual misconduct, financial mismanagement, and alcohol issues. Rhode Island senator Jack Reed, the committee's ranking member, noted that Hegseth had used the term "jagoff" in his book The War on Warriors (2024) to derogatorily refer to a Judge Advocate General officer who reprimanded him on the use of rocket-propelled grenades. He did not answer a question from Virginia senator Tim Kaine on whether or not sexual assault, drinking, or infidelity were disqualifying. The Committee on Armed Services voted to advance his nomination 14–13 along party lines on January 20, after Trump was inaugurated. Hegseth's former sister-in-law, Danielle, sent an affidavit to senators alleging that he was abusive to his second wife, Samantha, and that he had issues with over-consumption of alcohol. Hegseth denied having a drinking problem and pledged not to drink if confirmed.

On January 24, Hegseth was confirmed by the Senate in a 51–50 vote. Every Republican senator, except Susan Collins, Lisa Murkowski, and Mitch McConnell, voted to confirm him, while every Democratic senator opposed his nomination, leading to a 50–50 vote. Vance cast a tie-breaking vote to confirm Hegseth. His confirmation was threatened by Senator Thom Tillis, who told Senate majority leader John Thune the day before that he would not vote for Hegseth on the basis of his sexual assault allegations. Persuaded by Vance, Tillis expressed support for Hegseth on X minutes before the vote. His confirmation was the second in US history to be decided by a vice president, after Betsy DeVos's confirmation for secretary of education in 2017.

=== Initial actions ===
Hegseth is sworn in as secretary of defense by Vice President JD Vance.

Hegseth was sworn in as the secretary of defense by JD Vance on January 25. Hegseth identified several priorities for the Department of Defense, including to "revive the warrior ethos", restore trust in the military, redevelop the nation's industrial base, ease the department's process to purchase weaponry, defend the US domestically, engage with Indo-Pacific to deter China, and support Trump's effort to "end wars responsibly"—including the Russo-Ukrainian War and the Middle Eastern crisis. In a call to Israeli prime minister Benjamin Netanyahu a day after being sworn in, Hegseth said that the United States was "fully committed" to the security of Israel. Hegseth revoked the security clearance and detail of Mark Milley, the former chairman of the Joint Chiefs of Staff and chief of staff of the Army who later became a critic of Trump, and ordered an inspector general inquiry into Milley's tenure as chairman of the Joint Chiefs of Staff; the inspector general of the Department of Defense, Robert Storch, was removed from his position when Trump dismissed several inspectors general. According to The Washington Post, the Department of Defense Education Activity began removing certain books on immigration and sexuality.

Hegseth visited the Mexico–United States border with Tom Homan, Trump's border czar, in El Paso, Texas, in February, where he stated that the federal government intended to gain complete "operational control of the southern border". He renamed Fort Liberty to Fort Bragg, its original name honoring the Confederate general Braxton Bragg. The military base was now ostensibly renamed for Roland L. Bragg, a previously obscure soldier who served in World War II. In a meeting before the Ukraine Defense Contact Group at NATO headquarters, he opposed NATO membership for Ukraine and said that returning Ukraine's borders prior to the annexation of Crimea by Russia was "unrealistic". The Department of Defense invited Jack Posobiec, an alt-right political activist to accompany Hegseth, according to The Washington Post. Hegseth moderated his comments the following day, stating that it would be possible for Ukraine to join NATO given Trump's discretion.

In February 2025, Hegseth ordered officials within the Department of Defense to reduce funding on most initiatives and began a purge from within the department, firing three top judge advocate generals and Lisa Franchetti, the chief of naval operations. Hegseth stated that "we want lawyers who give sound constitutional advice" rather than "roadblocks to anything". In March, he ordered US Cyber Command to halt offensive operations against Russia, in an apparent effort to encourage Russian president Vladimir Putin to negotiate an end to the Russo-Ukrainian War. Also that month, the Defense Department canceled 91 of its research studies, including those on climate change impacts and social trends, while Hegseth later stated that the Defense Department "does not do climate change crap." Separately, the Trump administration instructed Hegseth to "immediately" present "credible military options to ensure fair and unfettered US military and commercial access to the Panama Canal".

=== Information disclosures and use of Signal ===
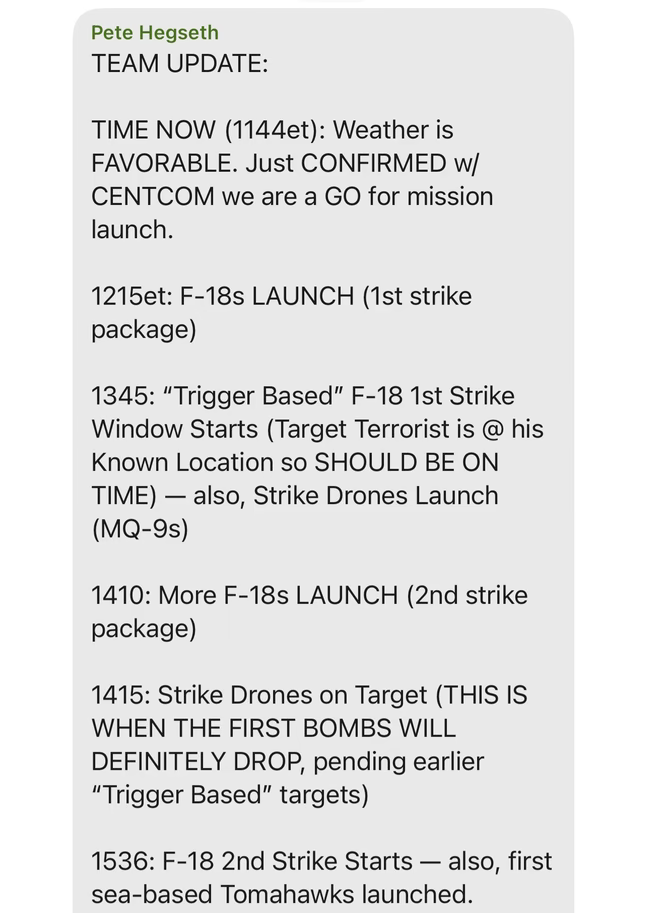

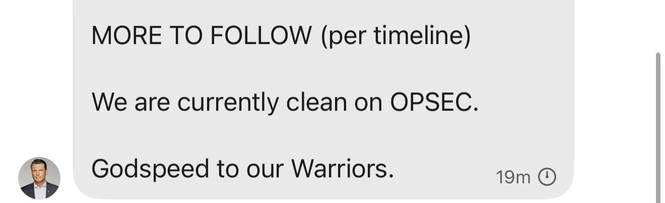
Screenshots from the leaked Signal chat showing Pete Hegseth discussing plans for the March–May 2025 United States attacks in Yemen

In March 2025, Jeffrey Goldberg, the editor-in-chief of The Atlantic, reported that he had been accidentally included by Mike Waltz in a Signal group chat where Hegseth shared information about attacks in Yemen hours before they occurred. The discussions involved US officials, including Vance and secretary of state Marco Rubio. According to The New York Times, several officials with the Department of Defense expressed shock at the incident, while various former national security officials noted the potential for espionage amid ongoing efforts by China to obtain telecommunications records. A spokesperson for the National Security Council confirmed Goldberg's report and the authenticity of the messages. Hegseth rejected that war plans were shared and called Goldberg "deceitful" and a "discredited so-called journalist". Director of National Intelligence Tulsi Gabbard said no classified information was shared and CIA director John Ratcliffe said Signal was authorized for the group chat.

The incident distressed Hegseth, who threatened to use a polygraph on Christopher W. Grady, the acting chairman of the Joint Chiefs of Staff. Goldberg later published most of the Signal chat. The chat showed that Hegseth posted information including the launch times of F-18 aircraft, MQ-9 drones and Tomahawk missiles, as well as the time when the F-18 aircraft would reach their targets, and the time when the bombs would land. Hegseth commented on the chat, writing that there were: "No names. No targets. No locations. No units. No routes. No sources. No methods. And no classified information". The incident led to criticism from both Republicans and Democrats. After the Signal leak, media outlet Der Spiegel searched the Internet using a commercial information provider and password leaks, which revealed Hegseth's personal mobile number, personal email address and its password, and WhatsApp account.

The Wall Street Journal reported that Hegseth had brought his wife to two meetings with foreign defense officials in which sensitive information was discussed, one meeting in February, at Brussels, with NATO officials, and the other in March, at the Pentagon, with British Defense Secretary John Healey. Meanwhile, the Associated Press reported in March that Hegseth's brother, Phil, was listed by the Trump administration as a senior adviser to Hegseth, accompanying Hegseth to meetings, including in Congress, and on official foreign trips. Phil, who previously worked in podcasting and media relations, was confirmed by Hegseth's office to be working in the Pentagon as a Department of Homeland Security liaison to the Department of Defense. That month, The Washington Post detailed a memorandum written by Hegseth orienting the department towards deterring a potential invasion of Taiwan and supporting homeland defense by "assuming risk" in Europe. The document contained passages that were identical to those present in Project 2025.

According to The Washington Post, Hegseth had Signal installed on his computer to circumvent cellular communication issues and to more easily communicate with other Trump officials. CNN later reported that Ricky Buria, a former aide to secretary of defense Lloyd Austin, had set up Signal on Hegseth's computer. According to the Associated Press, the computer was on an unsecured internet line that was not using one of the Department of Defense's IP addresses. In April, the Department of Defense Office of Inspector General announced an inquiry into Hegseth's disclosure of classified information in the Signal chat. That month, The New York Times reported that Hegseth had shared details on the attack in a second Signal chat with his wife, brother, and personal lawyer. At the White House Easter Egg Roll, Hegseth suggested that the revelations were a coordinated smear campaign. John Ullyot, the former spokesman for the Department of Defense, wrote in a Politico Magazine opinion piece hours later that the department was in a "full-blown meltdown" and warned that Hegseth was at risk of losing his position.

According to NPR, the White House began looking for a secretary of defense to replace Hegseth the following day. Nonetheless, he retained support from Trump, who privately did not seek to relitigate a grueling Senate confirmation, enjoyed Hegseth's presence and appearance on television, and believed that firing him would lead to questions over Waltz's retention, while he publicly associated the controversy to "disgruntled employees" and boasted of Hegseth's work. Karoline Leavitt, the White House press secretary, stated that "the entire Pentagon is working against" Hegseth. Representative Don Bacon became the first Republican House member to urge that Hegseth be fired. At least five political appointees within the Department of Defense resigned by April 24. That day, Joe Kesper, Hegseth's chief of staff, resigned, but stated that he would remain at the department as a special government employee. The firings and resignations led to a crisis within the Department of Defense that was described as a "free-for-all" by one employee who spoke to Politico.

=== Continued tenure ===
In April 2025, Hegseth issued a directive to the Secretary of the Army ordering a sweeping overhaul, prioritizing defending the homeland and deterring China in the Indo-Pacific. Among other things, the directive called for consolidated budget lines for unmanned systems, counter-drone systems, and electronic warfare; force-structure changes; and expanded use of other transaction agreements. The directive also instructed to downsize or close redundant headquarters as well as merging Army Futures Command and Training and Doctrine Command, and merging four-star headquarters Army Forces Command with Army North and Army South into a single headquarters focused on homeland defense as well as the elimination of at least 20% of four-star general positions to enhance efficiency and operational effectiveness. Hegseth also signed a memorandum to reduce the Department of Defense's civilian workforce, aiming to eliminate duplicative efforts and excessive bureaucracy. The initiative includes offering voluntary early retirement and deferred resignation programs to incentivize top performers and enhance efficiency. That month, Hegseth received criticism from some Senate Democrats over alleged civilian deaths in the Yemen strikes.

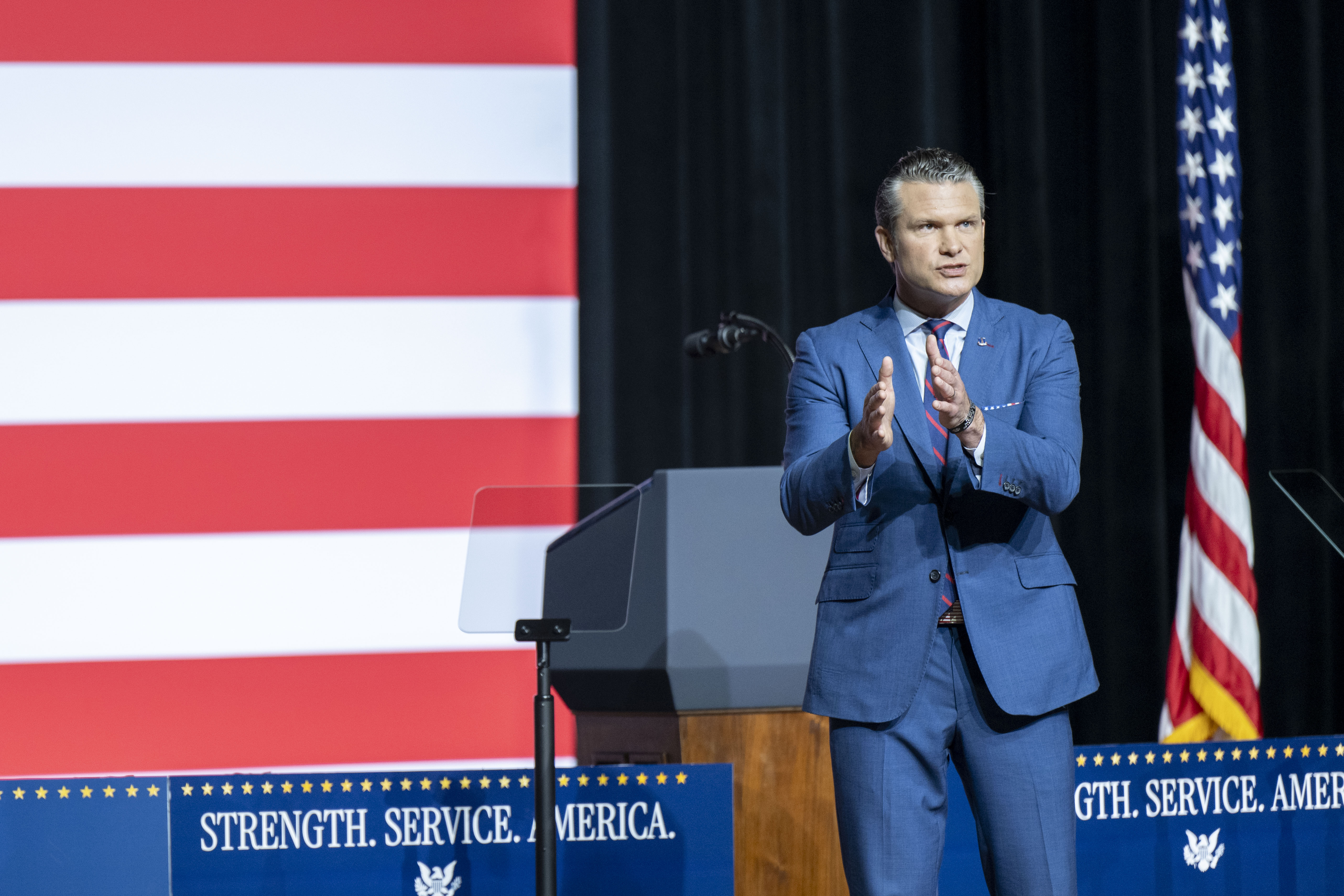
Hegseth at Quantico in September 2025

Hegseth defended the domestic military deployments by the second Trump administration. In September 2025, Hegseth gathered the Department of Defense's senior military leaders to Quantico, Virginia, for an address calling for tighter fitness standards and opposition to "woke garbage". The event featured Trump.

On November 24, 2025, Hegseth ordered a review of "serious allegations of misconduct" against Senator Mark Kelly — a retired Navy officer who had posted a video urging military and intelligence officials not to obey any illegal orders from the Trump Administration — with the explicit mention of potential "recall to active duty for court-martial procedures or administrative measures". Secretary of the Navy John Phelan was then tasked with this review and ordered to complete it by December 10, 2025. On January 5, 2026, Hegseth issued a Secretarial Letter of Censure against Senator Kelly in his capacity as a retired Navy Captain, without the right to appeal. On the same day, Senator Kelly was notified by the Office of the Chief of Naval Personnel that Retirement Grade Determination Proceedings would be started based on Hegseth's aforementioned Letter of Censure. In February 2026, a grand jury declined to return an indictment against Kelly and the others for the video. A federal judge subsequently issued a temporary injunction against Hegseth's proposed actions on Kelly's rank and pension based on the significant merits and very high likelihood of success of Kelly's appeal to protection of free speech under the First Amendment.

In December 2025, Hegseth proposed merging the Northern and Southern Commands into an "Americas" Command, and the European, Central, and Africa Commands into an International Command.

=== Changes to press policies ===
In October 2025, Hegseth implemented a new Pentagon press policy requiring journalists to pledge not to solicit or use unauthorized material, including unclassified information, or risk losing access to the building. The policy, which critics argued posed a threat to press freedom and First Amendment protections, was widely rejected by the media. Nearly all major US news organizations, including ABC, CNN, Fox News, The New York Times, and The Washington Post, refused to sign the agreement, citing concerns over press restrictions and government transparency. The only outlet to comply with the policy was One America News Network.

In March 2026, the Pentagon, reportedly at Hegseth's behest, began banning photographers from press briefings due to "unflattering" photos of the secretary. The Pentagon responded, "In order to use space in the Pentagon Briefing Room effectively, we are allowing one representative per news outlet," according to Pentagon press secretary Kingsley Wilson. "Photographs from the briefings are immediately released online for the public and press to use. If that hurts the business model for certain news outlets, then they should consider applying for a Pentagon press credential." Several news outlets reported that Pentagon staffers said Hegseth did not like some of the photos that had been published.

=== Caribbean boat strikes ===
Hegseth in a Cabinet Meeting on December 2, 2025

On November 28, 2025, The Washington Post published an article alleging Hegseth had given a spoken order to kill the survivors of a September 2, 2025, strike led by SEAL Team 6 on a boat suspected of carrying drugs in the Caribbean Sea. The operation was overseen by Admiral Frank M. "Mitch" Bradley, from Fort Bragg in North Carolina. Bradley described the survivors as legitimate targets, as they could theoretically have contacted other traffickers to rescue them and their cargo, and subsequently ordered the second strike to complete Hegseth's order that everyone must be killed. Hegseth's explanation for the strike has shifted over time. The Office of Legal Counsel eventually argued that the strike was legal because its goal was to destroy the boat, not to kill the crew, reflecting a secret legal memo endorsing such strikes; the memo has been "fiercely criticized" by legal experts. The strike was the first in a series of strikes against suspected drug traffickers. Hegseth's alleged orders were characterized by several legal experts as murder and a war crime.

The alleged orders were condemned by members of congress, including Representative Seth Moulton, who said "Mark my words: It may take some time, but Americans will be prosecuted for this, either as a war crime or outright murder." Both Senators Tim Kaine and Mark Kelly described the alleged orders as a war crime. Representative Mike Turner stated that "Obviously if that occurred, that would be very serious, and I agree that that would be an illegal act." On November 28, 2025, Senator Roger Wicker, chairman of the Senate Armed Services Committee, wrote in a statement that the committee had directed inquiries about the orders to the Department of Defense, and "we will be conducting vigorous oversight to determine the facts related to these circumstances." Hegseth subsequently defended his actions, writing on X that "As usual, the fake news is delivering more fabricated, inflammatory, and derogatory reporting to discredit our incredible warriors fighting to protect the homeland."

=== Pentagon Christian worship services and "biblically sanctioned war" ===
In May 2025, Secretary Hegseth began holding monthly Christian worship services during business hours at the Pentagon, and in February 2026, the Department of Defense began sending out invitations to defense contractors. Several stated that they feel that the services give Christians an advantage of "face time" with Pentagon officials that Jewish, Muslim, or other non-Christians would not be given unless they attended the services, which they believe to be discriminatory. Service members have also reported complaints to the Military Religious Freedom Foundation about the services, and the Freedom from Religion Foundation has stated that the services show that Christian personnel are favored over their non-Christian peers in the Department of Defense. The Pentagon stated it did not track the names of persons who attended or did not attend the services. The worship services have included far-right evangelical pastor Doug Wilson, the founder of the Communion of Reformed Evangelical Churches, of which the secretary is a member. Wilson has stated that homosexuality should be a crime and that women should not be able to vote.

In March 2026, soon after the start of the U.S. war against Iran, also known as Operation Epic Fury, it was reported that military leaders told their service members that the war was "part of God's divine plan" and that Trump was anointed by Jesus, whom Christians view as the Messiah. One commander reportedly quoted the Book of Revelation from the Christian Bible and said the war will bring the second coming of Jesus. The Military Religious Freedom Foundation received more than 200 complaints from 50 military installations, and said that such statements are a violation of the Uniform Code of Military Justice (UCMJ) and reflect Secretary Hegseth's leadership.

Multiple members of Congress are requesting an investigation into the DoD over the statements alleged to have been made by several military commanders using biblical references and claiming that the president was anointed by Jesus. The members included Rep. Chrissy Houlahan (D-PA), the ranking member of the House Armed Services Subcommittee on Military Personnel. A letter they sent to the military Inspector General stated, "If accurate, these outrageous statements—justifying a war based on interpretations of biblical prophecies, and informing troops that they are risking their lives to advance a specific religious vision—raises [sic] not only glaring Constitutional concerns, but potential violations of Department of Defense regulations regarding religious neutrality and breaches of professional obligations and standards expected of military leadership." The complaint asks to determine: if military commanders made the statements and, if so, where did the statements first originate in the chain of command; did the statements violate DoD Instruction 1300.17 on religious freedom; how widespread were the comments within the military; did service members fear retaliation for reporting the comments; what guidance and training exist to ensure compliance with the DoD policy; and what action should be taken against personnel who violated the policy.

On April 3, 2026, the Christian holiday of Good Friday, the Pentagon hosted a Protestant service in the Pentagon chapel. An email sent by Air Force leaders stated, "Just a friendly reminder: There will be a Protestant Service (No Catholic Mass) for Good Friday today at the Pentagon Chapel." At least one employee stated that they felt Catholics were not welcome. A 40-year Pentagon employee stated that it was the first time that a Catholic Good Friday service was not offered at the Pentagon Chapel.

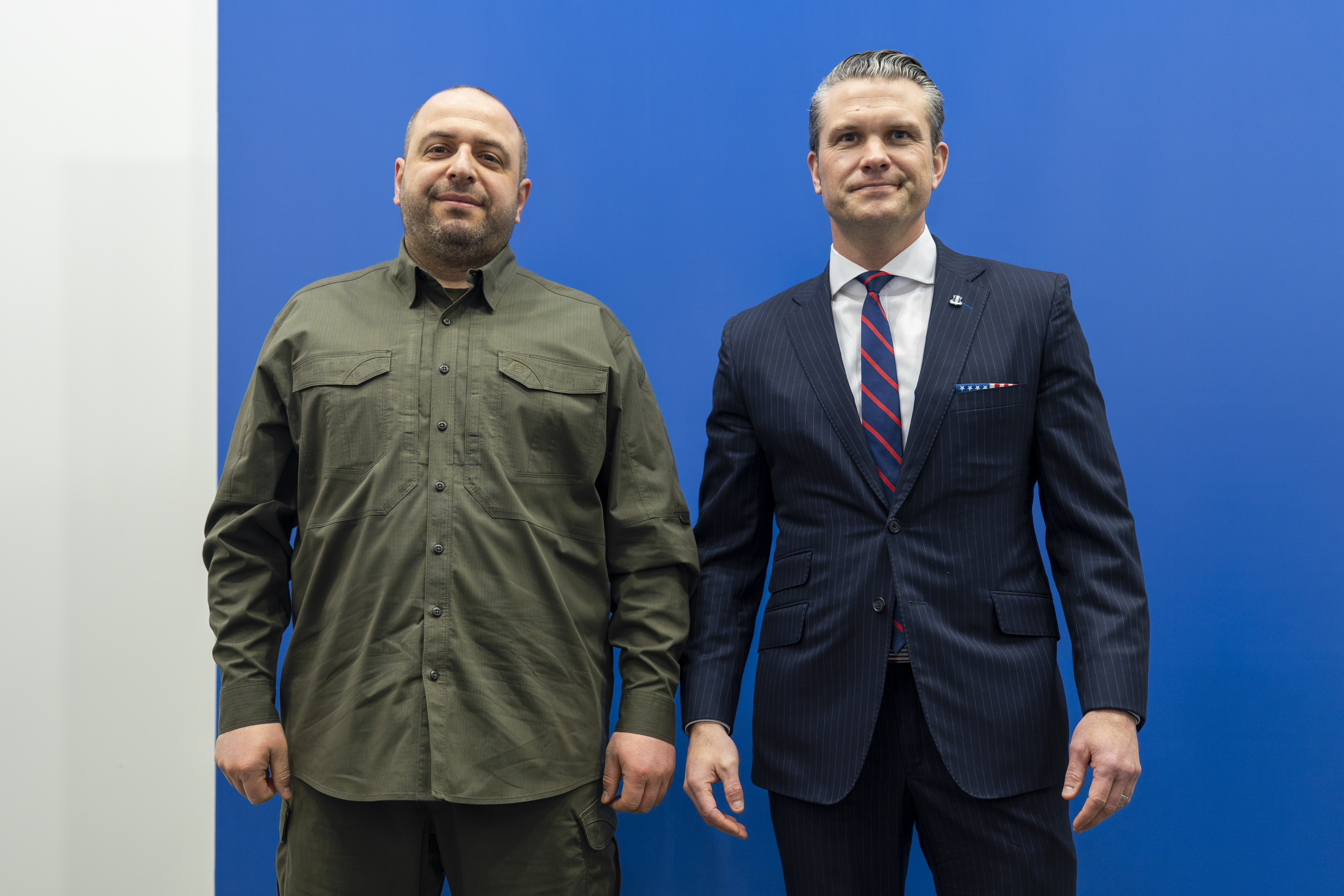
Hegseth and Ukrainian Defense Minister Rustem Umerov at NATO headquarters in Brussels, February 12, 2025

On April 15, 2026, Secretary Hegseth quoted a prayer based on lines from the 1994 film Pulp Fiction, part of which is from Ezekiel 25:17, during a Pentagon prayer session led by the secretary. The prayer had reportedly been used by the search and rescue team that saved two downed airmen in Iran earlier in April.

=== Policy on Scouting America ===
In November 2025, Hegseth in a draft memo proposed eliminating the promotion for Eagle Scouts who join the Army and other services due to the lack of "masculine values" and "promoting gender confusion." He also threatened to cut all support from the Department of Defense to Scouting America. The proposal in the draft memo would eliminate support for the National Jamboree as well as ban military bases from hosting or sponsoring scout units. He claimed that the organization was attacking "boy-friendly" spaces by allowing girls to join the organization in 2018. Military families and retired military have criticized the possible actions by Hegseth, stating it will harm military dependent children who depend on the organization as a stabilizing force. Other critics stated that this proposal would harm the military, as 20 percent of military academy students are former scouts and a number of scouts go directly into the military due to the partnership. Navy Secretary John Phelan wrote a memo of his own, stating, "Passive support to Scouting America through access to military installations and educational opportunities aboard said installations serve as a crucial recruiting and community engagement tool for the [Navy]".

On February 27, 2026, Scouting America announced that they would immediately drop the Citizenship in the Society merit badge, will create a military service merit badge and waive registration fees for dependent children of active duty military, National Guard and reserve families. Additionally, they agreed to only use the designations male and female on applications.

=== 2026 (Second year) ===
Reportedly, from about three dozen officers on a promotion list, most of them white men, Hegseth blocked the promotion of two women and two Black officers. According to The New York Times, "It is exceedingly rare that a one-star list draws such intense scrutiny from a defense secretary."

In early 2026, reports emerged of the dismissal or retirement of several senior military commanders amid rising military tensions between the United States and Iran and broader instability in the Middle East. These developments were described as part of a broader shift in Pentagon leadership, with multiple senior officers reportedly stepping down or being removed. Media outlets reported concerns regarding internal disagreements within the defense establishment and the potential impact on the stability and operational readiness of the military command structure. Some reactions criticized the rationale for the reductions, with concerns that the large-scale removal of senior officers without clear justification could affect military readiness.

In April 2026, Hegseth repealed the requirement for basic military trainees to receive the influenza vaccine. The requirement was restored in July 2026 after an outbreak at Joint Base San Antonio hospitalized four and killed one trainee.

In July 2026, Hegseth announced that the military would begin testing service members' testosterone levels and providing hormone therapy. The policy was rescinded in September 2026.

=== Removal of Anthropic AI ===
The Defense Secretary threatened Anthropic, the owner of Claude AI (the only AI authorized by the Department of Defense in early 2026), to designate the company a supply chain risk and force the company to eliminate its restrictions on the use of its AI by the Defense Department or he will use the Defense Production Act to compel them. The Defense Department gave Anthropic a deadline of February 27, 2026. The contract Sec. Hegseth wanted to cancel was worth $200 million. A senior defense official stated that the company will "pay a price for forcing our hand like this." Anthropic stated that they wanted assurances that the DoD would not use their AI tools to spy on Americans or develop weapons that could fire without human involvement. The Defense Department also stated in February 2026 that Grok, OpenAI and Google were close to being approved for use. Claude was used by the Pentagon during their January 2026 operation to capture Nicolás Maduro. In May 2026, the Defense Department announced AI use deals with SpaceX, OpenAI, Google, NVIDIA, Reflection, Microsoft and Amazon Web Services.

On February 27, 2026, Hegseth used the Federal Acquisition Supply Chain Security Act to declare Anthropic a supply-chain risk and exclude it from all federal contracts. President Trump also stated that every federal agency must stop using Anthropic's AI technology. ChatGPT signed a deal with the Defense Department the same day, but its CEO, Sam Altman, said, "The AI system shall not be intentionally used for domestic surveillance of U.S. persons and nationals." On March 6, 2026, Anthropic's CEO Dario Amodei said that his company will challenge the DoD in court. Officials with Anthropic's partners, including Microsoft, Amazon, and Google, said they agreed with Amodei. On March 8, 2026, OpenAI (the parent company of ChatGPT) announced that their head of robotics, Caitlin Kalinowski, had resigned, stating, "surveillance of Americans without judicial oversight and lethal autonomy without human authorization are lines that deserved more deliberation than they got."

=== Use of unmarked aircraft in military attacks ===
Sec. Hegseth was asked in January 2026 about a U.S. military plane that attacked a suspected drug boat in the Caribbean. The plane was not marked as a U.S. military plane and carried armaments inside the plane, according to reports. Using unmarked aircraft in military attacks is against Defense Department policy. Pentagon press secretary Kingsley Wilson did not deny the reports, and said, "the U.S. military utilizes a wide array of standard and nonstandard aircraft depending on mission requirements." The Pentagon went on to state that the plane was used because it was the quickest to get ready for the operation.

=== Elimination of graduate tuition assistance at certain schools ===
In February 2026, Sec. Hegseth announced that the Defense Department would eliminate graduate-level professional military training, fellowships, and certificate programs at Harvard University starting in the fall of 2026 because of the institution's "anti-military bias". In the a memo, Hegseth said the department would also investigate 33 other colleges and universities, including Princeton, Duke, Columbia, and Carnegie-Mellon. The Pentagon stated that service members could gain the same experience at lower cost from the war colleges, military academies, and public universities. Opponents said that this could hurt readiness and retention as mid-career officers see the programs as a benefit that can help them in their post-military careers. Georgetown law professor Rosa Brooks stated, "Cutting off their access to the best universities in the country is just plain dumb, and suggests Hegseth thinks officers can't be trusted to bring any critical thinking to their classes and academic work, distinguishing between opinion and fact."

On March 2, 2026, the Pentagon released a list of 20 partner institutions that Hegseth says are examples of "intellectual freedom, minimal relationships with adversaries, minimal public expressions in opposition of the Department, and Graduate-level National Security, International Affairs, and/or Public Policy Programs". The list included mainly public and a few private universities in Republican-leaning states such as The Citadel, Iowa State University, Clemson University, University of Florida, Auburn University, Baylor University and Liberty University. Virginia Governor Abigail Spanberger, a former CIA case officer, said the policy shows a "lack of understanding of the real strength of universities, whether it's William & Mary or others, in educating the next generation of military leadership." Spanberger noted that the chancellor of William & Mary is former Defense Secretary Robert Gates.

In March 2026, Harvard University announced that it would allow active-duty military to defer their admission to the university for up to four years. Students can normally only defer for one year.

=== Carrying of firearms on military bases ===
On April 2, 2026, Sec. Hegseth signed a memo allowing military personnel to carry personal firearms on military installations such as forts, camps, bases, naval yards, and recruitment centers. His stated purpose was to allow personnel to defend themselves during an attack and to support their Second Amendment rights. Supporters of the new policy, such as the family of slain Fort Hood specialist Vanessa Guillen, said it would save lives. It was unclear how the new policy would work in practice with state firearm laws, emergency response, and active threats.

=== Hatch Act ===
On May 16, 2026, a pro-Trump group announced that Hegseth would visit Kentucky to raise support for Ed Gallrein's primary contest against Thomas Massie. Hegseth was accused of violating the Hatch Act, which the White House denied.

=== Operation Epic Fury ===
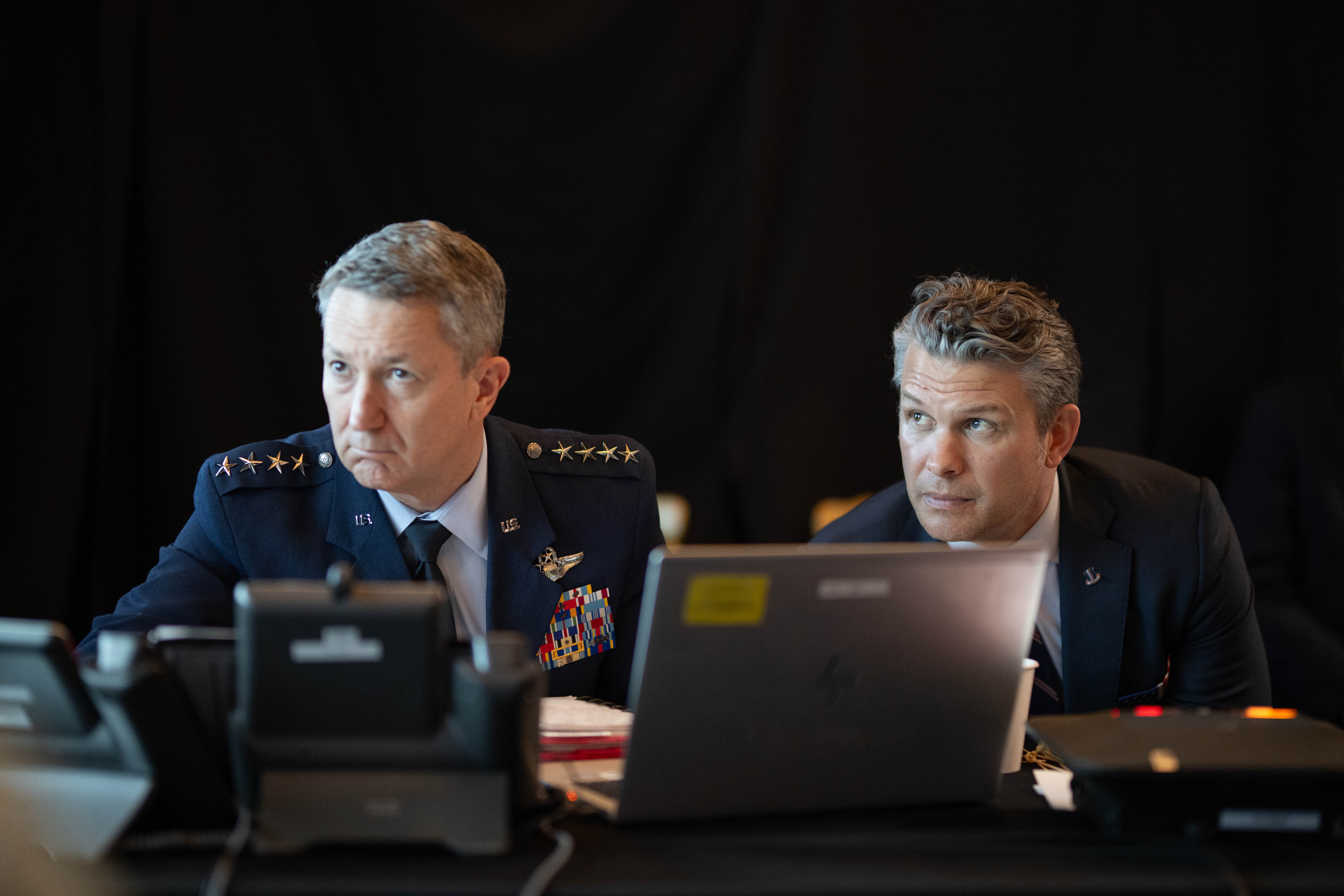
Hegseth and General Dan Caine listen as President Trump oversees Operation Epic Fury.

On March 2, 2026, Hegseth stated that joint U.S.-Israeli military operations against Iran were a response to prolonged Iranian targeting of American interests. He characterized the actions as an effort to conclude an existing conflict, stating, "We didn't start this war, but under President Trump we're finishing it." He noted the death of Supreme Leader Ali Khamenei during the strikes, remarking, "This is not a so-called regime change war, but the regime sure did change". He stated that the primary goals were to "destroy the missile threats, destroy the navy," and ensure there are "no nukes". During the briefing, he issued a direct warning to adversaries: "If you kill or threaten Americans anywhere in the world... we will hunt you down, and we will kill you".

Hegseth stated on March 4, 2026, that the Pentagon was "investigating" reports of a deadly airstrike on the Shajareh Tayyebeh girls' school in Minab, Iran, while maintaining that the U.S. military "never targets civilian sites." Evidence indicated that it was the U.S. which most likely bombed the school.

On March 10, 2026, Hegseth accused Iran of firing missiles from schools and hospitals and endangering civilians. He also said that Iran is "badly losing" on day 10 of the war.

==== Public opinion on impeachment ====
In a survey conducted by Economist/YouGov, half of the American public (50%) expressed strong or somewhat strong support for the impeachment of Defense Secretary Pete Hegseth, citing his decision to initiate military action against Iran without congressional authorization. Roughly three in ten Americans (30%) opposed such a move. This sentiment, however, is far from uniform across the political spectrum. Democrats demonstrated the highest level of support for impeachment, with 77% in favor and only 14% opposed. Independents also leaned toward impeachment, with 50% in support and 22% against. Republicans, by contrast, largely rejected the idea, opposing impeachment by 53% to 26%.

=== Response to press coverage ===
Hegseth has criticized the reporting of U.S. military casualties and deaths. He said that the news coverage of U.S. service member casualties was unfair and that "the press only wants to make the president look bad", and "when a few drones get through or tragic things happen, it's front-page news".

At a March 2026 press conference, Hegseth said:

We will keep pressing. We will keep pushing, keep advancing, no quarter, no mercy for our enemies. Yet some in this crew, in the press, just can't stop. Allow me to make a few suggestions. People look up at the TV and they see banners, they see headlines. I used to be in that business. And I know that everything is written intentionally.

For example, a banner or a headline: "Mideast war intensifies," splashing on the screen the last couple of days, alongside visuals of civilian or energy targets that Iran has hit, because that's what they do. What should the banner read instead?

How about, 'Iran increasingly desperate,' because they are. They know it and so do you, if it can be admitted. Or more fake news from CNN, "reports that the Trump administration underestimated the Iran war's impact on the Strait of Hormuz" – patently ridiculous, of course. For decades, Iran has threatened shipping in the Strait of Hormuz.

This is always what they do, hold the strait hostage. CNN doesn't think we thought of that. It's a fundamentally unserious report. The sooner David Ellison takes over that network, the better.

Another example of a fake headline that I saw yesterday, "war widening." Here's a real headline for you, for an actual patriotic press: how about, 'Iran shrinking, going underground'? You see, Iran's leaders are hiding in bunkers and moving into civilian areas. The only thing that is widening is our advantage, not to mention our Gulf partners stepping up even more, now going on the offense, and have always been with us on the defense with collective and integrated air defenses.

In April 2026, Hegseth compared the press to biblical Pharisees. "The Pharisees: the so-called and self-appointed elites of their time; they were there to witness, to write everything down, to report," Hegseth said.

=== Response to Russia and China ===
On March 6, 2026, Hegseth dismissed reports from CBS News and other outlets citing U.S. officials who claimed Russia was providing intelligence to Iran regarding American positions in the Middle East. Hegseth stated, "We're putting the other guys in danger, and that's our job. So we're not concerned about that. ... But the only ones that need to be worried right now are Iranians that think they're gonna live."

However, four days later, he warned Russia against intervention following further reports of its alleged assistance in targeting U.S. military assets in the Middle East.

While Hegseth initially dismissed China as "irrelevant" to the conflict in early March 2026, his stance shifted by the end of the month following reports of alleged technological support to Tehran. On March 31, he stated the U.S. was "addressing and mitigating" Chinese involvement. However, on April 16, Hegseth announced that Beijing had provided high-level assurances to the White House that it would not send weapons to Iran, citing direct communication between President Trump and Xi Jinping ahead of a planned summit in Beijing.

=== Army leaders' resignations ===
In April 2026, Hegseth fired Army Chief of Staff Gen. Randy George, the eighth general or flag officer fired or forced out by the secretary of defense. This left the Army without an appointed chief for the longest period in its history.

On August 31, 2026, Secretary of the Army Dan Driscoll resigned after he met face-to-face with President Trump to express his concerns about Hegseth's firing of generals.

=== Support of military members ===
==== Religious greetings ====
On September 3, 2026, the Military Religious Freedom Foundation (MRFF) reported more than 30 complaints about airmen using religious greetings in uniform on Kirtland Air Force Base in New Mexico. After complaints were issued to base officials, the greetings stopped. But on September 4, the Secretary of Defense wrote that the "Pentagon will never cave to them. The Air Force will confront this" The greetings appear to be in conflict with Air Force Instruction 1-1, Section 2.16.

==== Other encouragements ====
In late September 2026, Logan Paul and Jake Paul were invited to The Pentagon supposedly by United States Department of the Treasury Scott Bessent and Pete Hegseth to give a speech to the troops.

=== Capital punishment ===
On September 24, 2025, Hegseth announced that he was seeking formal approval for Nidal Hasan's execution from president Donald Trump.

On October 5, 2026, the U.S. Department of Defense, via Pentagon spokesperson Sean Parnell, issued a statement saying that Hegseth had recommended, and President Trump approved, execution by U.S. Army firing squad.

On October 8, Hegseth stated that Hasan's execution will be a public execution, and the Pentagon stated that it will be livestreamed. If carried out, it will be the first public execution in the United States in 90 years.

If carried out, Hasan would be the first sitting member of the United States Armed Forces to be executed since John A. Bennett was executed in 1961 for rape and attempted murder and the first person executed publicly in the U.S. since that of Roscoe Jackson in 1937.

On October 13, 2026, Archbishop Timothy Broglio (Archdiocese for the Military Services, USA) stated that Catholic soldiers are obliged to decline to participate in the firing squad execution of Hasan. He also stated that any such action is contrary to the teaching of the Catholic Church and does not reflect the dignity of the human person.

=== Impeachment ===
On November 9, 2026, Rep. Thomas Massie, R-Kentucky, filed articles of impeachment against Hegseth. Three of the articles concern the Iran war; they accuse Hegseth of waging the war without congressional authorization and continuing it after Congress voted to direct the president to terminate the conflict or seek authorization to continue it. "The remaining charges accuse Mr. Hegseth of carrying out unlawful military strikes against suspected drug traffickers; unlawfully capturing Venezuela's president, Nicolás Maduro; conducting unauthorized military operations in Yemen; disregarding laws intended to minimize civilian casualties; and abusing his power by retaliating against Senator Mark Kelly for protected speech," The New York Times reported. On November 10, 2026, the House voted 211–204 to refer the resolution to the Judiciary Committee, effectively blocking a vote on the articles for the remainder of the 119th Congress.
