= OpenAI and trade unions =

OpenAI relations to working conditions

OpenAI, an American artificial intelligence corporation employs 4,500 employees as of 2026. It does not have any recognized trade unions. Employees have signed public open letters regarding their employer.

== Subcontractors ==
51 data annotators in Nairobi, Kenya, employed by Sama were subcontracted to work on ChatGPT from 2021 to 2022. Workers alleged long-term psychological harm and lack of transparency about the nature of their tasks, which included reviewing graphic, violent images and text for less than USD$2 an hour. 150 workers subcontracted to work on ChatGPT, TikTok and Meta formed the African Content Moderator's Union on May 1, 2023.

== Open letters by employees ==
300 Google employees and 60 OpenAI employees supported the lawsuit in early 2026, launched by Anthropic, a competitor regarding their contract disputes with the US military over the usage of AI by the military and subsequent contract termination.

=== Removal of Sam Altman ===
In response to Sam Altman's removal as CEO in November 2023, 738 of OpenAI's 770 employees signed an open letter stating they would quit their jobs and join Microsoft if the board did not rehire Altman and then resign. This prompted OpenAI investors to consider legal action against the board as well. In response, OpenAI management sent an internal memo to employees stating that negotiations with Altman and the board had resumed.
