= The Abelard School =

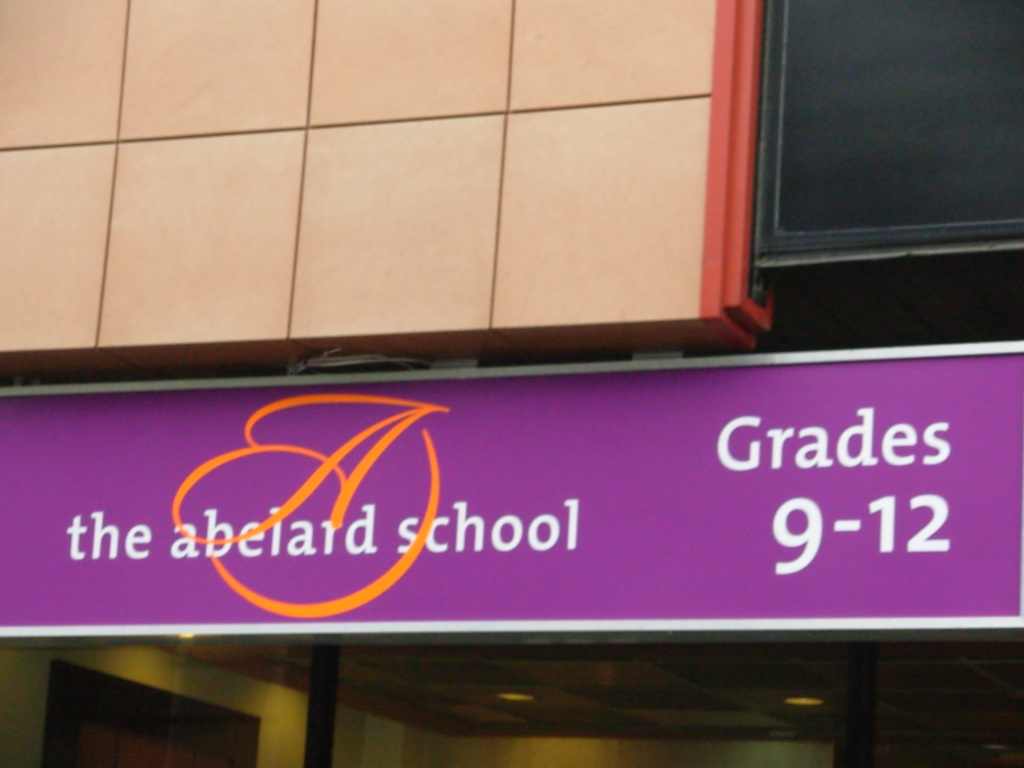

Location
- 557 Church Street, 4th Floor; Toronto, Ontario, M4Y 2E2; Canada; 43°40′2″N 79°23′0″W

Information
- School type: Academic private high school and middle school
- Motto: Sapere aude - Don't be afraid to think!
- Established: 1997
- Principal: Mark Young
- Faculty: 15
- Grades: 7–12
- Enrollment: 50
- Language: English
- Educational philosophy: Socratic method
- Website: www.abelardschool.org

The Abelard School is a private school in Toronto, Ontario, Canada that was named after the 12th century French philosopher Peter Abelard. Its teaching philosophy is based on the Socratic method.

== History ==
The school was founded in 1997 by a group of four teachers: Brian Blair, Michelle Lefolii, Shai Maharaj, and Alina Rossinsky. In September 2006, The Abelard School moved to a location near the University of Toronto. In 2017, The Abelard School moved to a new location at 557 Church St, at Church and Wellesley.

== Organization ==
The school has a yearly enrollment of around 50 students educated by seven full-time faculty members, and several part-time faculty members, all of whom have advanced degrees in their field.

The school follows an accelerated curriculum, with students taking courses above their grade level. The courses run the full academic year.

== Education ==
The school educates in grades 7–12 and prepares pupils for the Ontario Secondary School Diploma and teaches the ministry requirements. Class sizes range between one and fifteen students. Advanced Placement (AP) courses are offered to students who excel in certain areas, and who consistently achieve outstanding results in the subject area.

In addition to the provincially mandated French language class, grade nine students must also take a year of Latin and continue French in grade 10. Students are strongly encouraged to continue their language studies through grade 12 and there is a bi-annual trip to Paris for advanced French students.

Grade nine students also take a Foundation Studies in the Sciences course, which covers both grade nine and ten science. This allows them to move directly into the specialized grade 11 courses in Biology, Chemistry, and Physics in grade 10 and potentially take every grade 11 and 12 science course.

== Alumni ==
- Vitalik Buterin, co-founder of Ethereum, attended the school from grades nine through twelve
- Kay Gabriel, academic based at New York University
- Christopher Olah, co-founder of Anthropic
- Noam Sienna, academic, sofer, and author
