= Polysemanticity =

Phenomenon in neural networks

Polysemanticity is a phenomenon in neural networks in which individual neurons respond to multiple unrelated concepts rather than to a single well-defined one. A polysemantic neuron might activate for legal text, DNA sequences, and Hebrew script simultaneously. Because such neurons cannot be straightforwardly interpreted, polysemanticity is a central obstacle in mechanistic interpretability.

== Background ==
Mechanistic interpretability often begins from the hope that internal model components correspond to human-readable concepts. In practice, many neurons in trained models activate across semantically unrelated inputs, making them difficult to analyze in isolation. A major theoretical treatment of the phenomenon came in a 2022 paper by Nelson Elhage and colleagues at Anthropic, which argued that polysemanticity can arise from superposition and studied it in controlled toy models. An article in 2026 by an OpenAI researcher argued that superposition may not be the cause, and that it may be the process of "recursive generalization" instead.

== Superposition hypothesis ==
The dominant explanation for polysemanticity is the superposition hypothesis. Real-world data contains more distinct features than a network has neurons. A network can therefore represent more features than it has dimensions by encoding them as overlapping linear combinations across many neurons. The trade-off is that individual neurons end up responsive to multiple unrelated features that share representational directions. Elhage et al. argued that this trade-off can be loss-minimizing, increasing representational capacity at the expense of interpretability.

== Recursive generalization hypothesis ==
The 2026 article Neural Networks Are Already Clean challenges the superposition hypothesis in favor of a recursive generalization hypothesis. Rather than unrelated neurons being grouped together (superposition), the authors argue that recursive generalization grows branches of related concepts, resulting in seemingly unrelated terms that share a recursive tree. The example they provide is "iy" grows to "diy", which grows to "do it yourself", which does not contain "iy" at all. The authors argue that superposition may pose difficulties for interpretability, while recursive generalization may imply easier mechanistic interpretability of neural networks. A follow up article demonstrated individual neurons can be effectively interpreted through ablation methods to identify strong activations. The computational function of the neurons can be described in natural language to predict neuronal firing with 95% accuracy.

An example of a natural language description of a singular neuron is on Neuron L9_E223_N10:

"Fires on the percent sign after "1" (or ".1") in 'the 1%' wealth-inequality rhetoric, as in Occupy-style talk of the top 1% controlling wealth, profits and tax breaks, writing into social-class and wealth-share readers."

— Neurons as an Interpretable Basis

== Sparse autoencoders ==
One approach to recovering interpretable structure from polysemantic representations is to train a sparse autoencoder on the activations of the model being studied. The autoencoder learns a larger set of directions, each of which ideally corresponds to a single concept. A 2023 Anthropic paper reported that dictionary learning could decompose a 512-neuron transformer layer into more than 4,000 such features. A 2024 follow-up applied the technique to Claude 3 Sonnet and reported many interpretable features, including some that appeared safety-relevant.

MIT Technology Review named mechanistic interpretability one of its ten breakthrough technologies of 2026.
