= Varndean =

Varndean is the name given to two separate educational establishments located on the hills to the north of Brighton in England:

- Varndean School, for pupils aged 11–16 years
- Varndean College, for students aged 16 and over
