= Jared Kaplan =

American theoretical physicist and artificial intelligence researcher

- Kaplan in 2025
- Born: Jared Daniel Kaplan
- Education: Stanford University (BS); Harvard University (PhD)
- Known for: Neural language-model scaling laws; Responsible Scaling Policy at Anthropic
- Awards: Hertz Fellowship (2005); Sloan Research Fellowship; NSF CAREER Award
- Scientific career
- Fields: Theoretical physics Machine learning
- Workplaces: Johns Hopkins University; OpenAI; Anthropic
- Thesis: Aspects of holography (2009)
- Doctoral advisor: Nima Arkani-Hamed

Jared Daniel Kaplan is an American theoretical physicist and artificial intelligence researcher. He is an associate professor in the Johns Hopkins University Department of Physics & Astronomy, and a co-founder and chief science officer of Anthropic.

== Education ==
Kaplan attended high school at Illinois Mathematics and Science Academy, graduating in 2001. He received a bachelor's degree in physics and mathematics from Stanford University and a PhD in physics from Harvard University. His doctoral thesis is titled Aspects of holography, advised by Nima Arkani-Hamed.

== Academic career and physics research ==
Kaplan’s research interests include quantum gravity, holography (AdS/CFT), conformal field theory, and related topics in particle physics and cosmology. He worked as a postdoctoral fellow at SLAC and Stanford University and has been a professor of physics at Johns Hopkins University since 2012.

== Machine learning research ==
Kaplan joined OpenAI in 2019 as a researcher, where he co-authored Scaling Laws for Neural Language Models (2020), which reported that empirically, the performance of language models steadily improves with their size and the amount of data and compute used for training. He co-authored the research paper Language Models are Few-Shot Learners (2020), which introduced GPT-3. At the company, he was also involved in the development of Codex.

== Anthropic ==
Kaplan co-founded Anthropic and serves as its chief science officer. In October 2024, Anthropic announced that Kaplan would serve as the company's "Responsible Scaling Officer", overseeing its responsible scaling policy (RSP). In this role, Kaplan determines the safety assessments and precautions to adopt before model release.

In a December 2025 interview for The Guardian, Kaplan argued that humanity will have to decide by 2030 whether to take the risk of giving AI the autonomy to recursively improve itself, which he said could be beneficial but could also lead to humans losing control of AI.

== Honors and recognition ==
Kaplan was a 2005 Hertz Fellow. He has also received a Sloan Research Fellowship and an NSF CAREER award.

== Selected works ==
- Scaling Laws for Neural Language Models (2020).
- Language Models are Few-Shot Learners (2020).
- A Natural Language for AdS/CFT Correlators (2011).

== Personal life ==
As of 2026, Forbes estimated Kaplan's net worth at $3.7 billion. He lives in Pacifica, California, and has a son.
