= Initial public offering of Anthropic =

2026 IPO of the AI company Anthropic

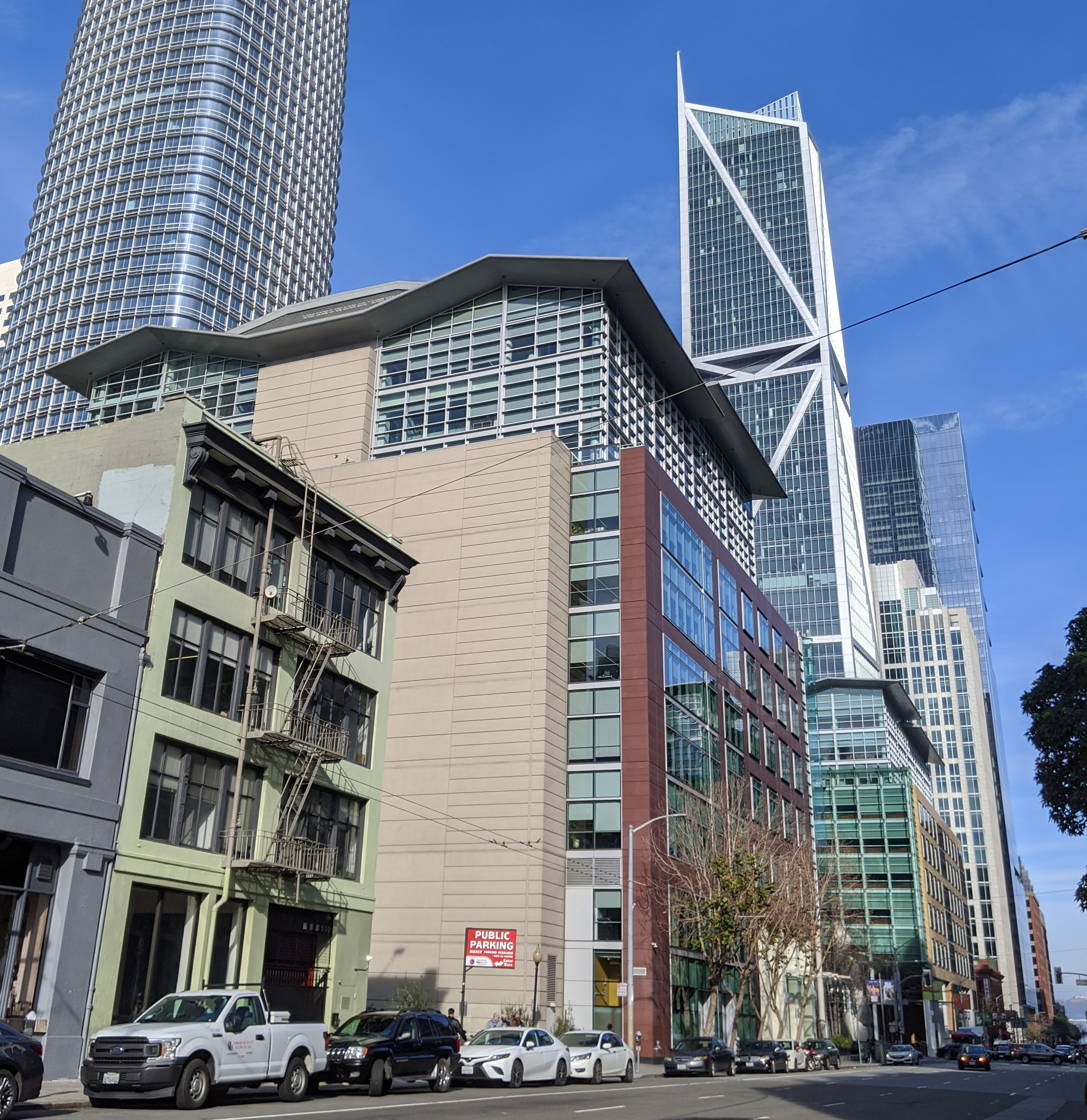
Anthropic headquarters in San Francisco

Anthropic, an American artificial intelligence company, held its initial public offering (IPO) on November 19, 2026, with shares trading on Nasdaq under the ticker symbol ANT. The IPO raised roughly $81 billion and valued the company at around $1.5 trillion, making it the largest IPO in history by amount raised (not including overallotments).

== Preparation ==
The company confidentially filed the IPO on June 1, 2026. Reuters reported the IPO could value the company at $2 trillion. Some analysts estimated the IPO could raise up to $100 billion. In November 2026, Bloomberg reported the company was seeking to raise up to $90 billion in public and private offerings at a fully diluted valuation of $1.4 trillion. Later reporting suggested the IPO was said to be "multiple times oversubscribed".

== Public trading ==
Anthropic began trading on the Nasdaq on November 19, 2026. Anthropic offered 980 million Class A shares at $83 a share priced on November 18, 2026. When market opened the shares began trading at $111.50 giving the company a valuation of $2 trillion. The price dropped throughout the day and closed at $97.

== Public benefit fund ==
On October 18, 2026, the company announced that it would be committing 5% of shares to the Anthropic Public Benefit Fund, a new fund inside the company.

== Japan ==
On November 2, 2026, Anthropic filed a securities registration statement in Japan for an offering of Class A shares worth up to an estimated US$3.5 billion (¥552.9 billion). This amount covered only the Japanese portion of its proposed US IPO, with shares to be distributed through six Japanese securities firms. The filing stated that approval for its proposed Nasdaq listing remained pending and that no listing on a Japanese stock exchange was planned. Proceeds from the Japanese offering were intended to fund working capital, operating expenses and capital expenditure.

== See also ==
- Initial public offering of OpenAI
- Initial public offering of SpaceX
- Initial public offering of Facebook
- MiniMax
- Zhipu AI
