= Jack Clark (AI policy expert) =

English AI professional

Jack Clark (born 1988) is a co-founder of Anthropic who currently serves as its head of public benefit. He also leads the Anthropic Institute, a think tank dedicated to producing research on the societal implications of frontier AI. He previously served as Anthropic's head of policy. He is engaged in global AI policy, serving as an expert for the Global Partnership on AI and on an AI committee of the OECD. As of November 2026, Forbes estimated his net worth at US$21.3 billion.

== Career ==
Clark was born in Brighton, England. He was educated at Varndean College, where he obtained As in English, history, and philosophy at A-level. He read English literature and creative writing at the University of East Anglia, graduating with an upper second-class honours degree in 2009.

Before joining OpenAI, Clark was a technology journalist, writing about topics including distributed systems, quantum computing, and AI for news outlets like The Register and Bloomberg News.

Clark worked at OpenAI from 2016 to 2020, doing strategy and communications and becoming policy director. He then co-founded and joined Anthropic.

Clark maintains a newsletter called "Import AI", which covers AI-related news, analyses, and includes short stories. Clark is co-chair of Stanford's AI Index (an organization that publishes yearly reports on the state of AI progress), and of the OECD's working group for classifying and defining AI systems.

In 2023, Clark gave a briefing at the first United Nations Security Council meeting on AI’s threats to global peace, where he argued for "developing ways to test for capabilities, misuses and potential safety flaws" of AI systems, and encouraged global action. In 2024, he pushed back against claims that AI progress was slowing, and warned that most people are not prepared for its pace.

In 2025, Clark wrote in his newsletter Import AI an essay named "Technological Optimism and Appropriate Fear". Clark wrote about advanced AI, "make no mistake: what we are dealing with is a real and mysterious creature, not a simple and predictable machine." The pro-regulation stance of Clark and Anthropic were criticized by David Sacks (Donald Trump's AI and crypto czar) who warned that AI regulation would reduce the United States' ability to compete with China.

== See also ==
- AI safety
- Regulation of artificial intelligence
