= Varndean College =

Varndean Sixth Form College

Location
- Surrenden Road; Brighton, East Sussex, BN1 6WQ; England; 50.8516°N 0.1435°W

Information
- Type: Sixth form college
- Established: 1884
- Department for Education URN: 130668 Tables
- Ofsted: Reports
- Principal: Donna-Marie Janson
- Gender: Coeducational
- Age: 16–19+
- Enrolment: c. 2,000
- Website: https://www.varndean.ac.uk

Varndean Sixth Form College is a sixth form college in Brighton and Hove that serves the needs of sixth form students and adults.

== Location ==
Varndean Sixth Form College is on Surrenden Road, in the northern part of Brighton. It shares the Surrenden campus with Balfour Junior School, Balfour Infants School, Dorothy Stringer School and Varndean Secondary School.

== History ==
The college was founded in 1884 in York Place, Brighton, as a boys' secondary school and moved to its current site (overlooking the city and the sea) in 1932, later attaining grammar school status, becoming Varndean Grammar School for Boys, administered by the Education Committee for the County Borough of Brighton. In 1972 the first girls were admitted to the school (a small number of girls attended A level physics classes at the school in 1970–71), and in 1975 it became a sixth form college under its first principal, David A.G. Turner.

== Former Headmasters and Principals ==
Varndean Grammar School for Boys

- 1884–1901 Edwin H. Lethbridge (died 1932)
- 1902–1932 William J. Stainer (died 1937)
- 1932–1963 Eric J. Hutchins (died 1972)
- 1963–1970 John E. Mollison (1916–2003)
- 1970–1975 David A.G. Turner (died 1997)

Varndean College

- 1975–1988 David A.G. Turner (died 1997)
- 1988–2006 Alan Jenkins (died March 2020)
- 2006–2020 Philip Harland
- 2020–present day Donna-Marie Janson

== Notable alumni ==
The Old Varndeanian Association exists to maintain a network between former pupils and students of both the school and college, as well as former pupils of Varndean Girls' School. The association maintains contact with thousands of Old Varndeanians and organises regular reunions and other functions.

- Richard Toye, celebrity academic
- Alfie Deyes, YouTuber
- Celeste, singer
- Jack Clark, co-founder of Anthropic
- Bobby Barry, musician
- Darius Danesh actor, singer, reality star
- Lucy Griffiths, actress
- Natasha Kaplinsky, television presenter
- Dan and Tom Searle, twin musicians from the Brighton based band Architects
- Gwendoline Christie, actor

=== Varndean Grammar School for Boys ===
- Desmond Lynam, broadcaster
- David Collings, actor
- Dave Greenfield, The Stranglers (keyboards) 1960–1967
- Steve Ovett, Olympic athlete
- Simon Schaffer, historian
- Paul Scofield, actor
- Mike Winch, Commonwealth Games shot-putter and national coach
