= Initial public offering of Facebook =

Stock market event

The technology company Facebook, Inc., (Note: Facebook, Inc. changed its name to Meta Platforms, Inc. in October 2021.) now known as Meta Platforms, held its initial public offering (IPO) on Friday, May 18, 2012, with shares trading on Nasdaq under the ticker symbol FB. (Note: The company changed their stock ticker to META in early 2022. After their rebrand from Facebook to Meta Platforms, they were going to change their stock ticker to MVRS in December of 2021, but this was delayed and ultimately abandoned.) The IPO was one of the biggest in technology and Internet history, with a peak market capitalization of over $104 billion.

== Context ==
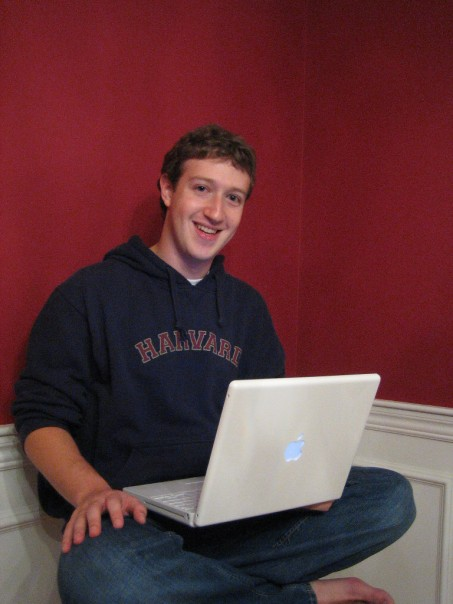
Facebook founder Mark Zuckerberg resisted buyout offers, suggesting the company was "definitely in no rush."

For years, Facebook and Mark Zuckerberg, its co-founder and CEO, resisted both buyouts and taking the company public. The main reason that the company decided to go public is because it crossed the threshold of 500 shareholders, according to Reuters financial blogger Felix Salmon.

Facebook reportedly turned down a $750 million offer from Viacom in 2006. That same year, Yahoo! attempted to buy the company for $1 billion but Zuckerberg refused. Also that year, BusinessWeek reported a $2 billion valuation for the company.

Facebook did accept investments from companies, and these investments suggested fluctuating valuations for the firm. In 2007 Microsoft beat out Google to purchase a 1.6% stake for $240 million, giving Facebook a notional value of $15 billion at the time. Microsoft purchased preferred stock, which meant that the company's actual valuation would be considerably lower than $15 billion. Meanwhile, that valuation dropped to $10 billion in 2009, when Digital Sky Technologies bought a nearly 2% stake for $200 million – a larger stake than Microsoft had purchased at a lower price. An investment report in 2011 valued the company at $50 billion.

Zuckerberg wanted to wait to conduct an initial public offering, saying in 2010 that "we are definitely in no rush." However, since 2012 Facebook had more than 500 round lot (over 100 shares) stockholders, Facebook was subject to the SEC disclosure rules starting the next year, 2013. Zuckerberg had little choice as to whether an IPO had to be done at once.

== Preparation ==
=== Filing and roadshow ===
Facebook filed for an initial public offering on February 1, 2012, by filing their S1 document with the Securities and Exchange Commission (SEC). The preliminary prospectus announced that the company had 845 million active monthly users and that its website featured 2.7 billion daily likes and comments. The filing noted that the company's increases in membership, as well as its incomes, were slowing and that the deceleration was likely to continue.

To ensure that early investors would retain control of the company, Facebook in 2009 instituted a dual-class stock structure. After the IPO, Zuckerberg was to retain a 22% ownership share in Facebook and was to own 57% of the voting shares. The document also stated that the company was seeking to raise US$5 billion, which would make it one of the largest IPOs in tech history and the biggest in Internet history.

The roadshow faced a "rough start" initially. Zuckerberg raised controversy for wearing a hoodie (rather than a customary business suit) to the first meeting with investors. Wedbush Securities analyst Michael Pachter called it a "mark of immaturity." A half-hour-long video played during that meeting also frustrated investors who wanted to discuss more technical details, and was dropped for future meetings.

=== Valuation ===
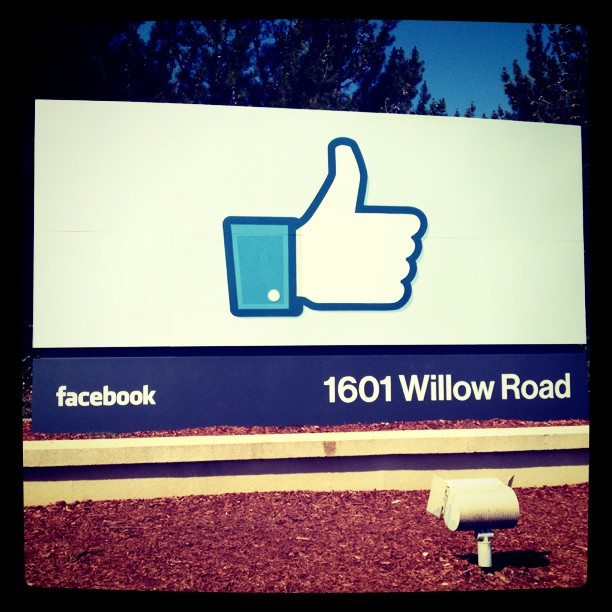
Facebook's valuation steadily increased in the days leading up to the IPO.

Prior to the official valuation, the target price of the stock steadily increased. In early May, the company was aiming for a valuation somewhere from $28 to $35 per share ($77 billion to $96 billion). On May 14, it raised the targets from $34 to $38 per share. Some investors even suggested a $40 valuation, although a dip in the stock market on the day before the IPO ended such speculation.

Strong demand, especially from retail investors, suggested Facebook could choose a relatively high offering price. Ultimately underwriters settled on a price of $38 per share, at the top of its target range. This price valued the company at $104 billion, the largest valuation to date for a newly public company.

On May 16, two days before the IPO, Facebook announced that it would sell 25% more shares than originally planned due to high demand. This increased the total number of shares to be sold at the IPO to 421 million.

The Facebook IPO brought inevitable comparisons with other technology company offerings. Some investors expressed keen interest in Facebook because they felt they had missed out on the massive gains Google saw in the wake of its IPO. LinkedIn stock, meanwhile, had doubled on its first day.

At $26.81 per share, which Facebook closed at a week after its IPO, Facebook was valued like "an ultra-growth company," according to Robert Leclerc of the Financial Post. Its PE ratio was 85, despite a decline in both earnings and revenue in the first quarter of 2012.

A number of commentators argued retrospectively that Facebook had been heavily overvalued because of an illiquid private market on SecondMarket, where trades of stock were minimal and thus pricing unstable. Facebook's aggregate valuation went up from January 2011 to April 2012, before plummeting after the IPO in May – but this was in a largely illiquid market, with less than 120 trades each quarter during 2010 and 2011. "Valuations in the private market are going to make it 'difficult to go public'", according to Mary Meeker, an American venture capitalist and former Wall Street securities analyst.

==== Price targets ====
Prior to the IPO, several investors set price targets for the company. On May 14, before the offering price was announced, Sterne Agee analyst Arvind Bhatia pegged the company at $46 in an interview with The Street. The interviewer cautioned Bhatia against what she perceived as Bhatia's low valuation, suggesting the stock could rise to "60, 70, 80 dollars" and could shoot up to $60 on the first day of trading. On May 17, the day before the offering, analyst Jim Krapfel of Morningstar suggested that only a 50% or better increase on the first day would be seen positively; "anything under that would be underwhelming." Lee Simmons of Dun & Bradstreet predicted more modest first-day gains, in the range of 10 to 20%. No analysts Reuters interviewed projected a first-day decrease. Others were less optimistic. Much of Wall Street expressed concerns over what it saw as a high valuation. Citing the price-to-earnings ratio of 108 for 2011, critics stated that the company would have to undergo "almost ridiculous financial growth [for the valuation] to make sense." Other companies trade at far lower ratios, although there are notable exceptions. Writers at TechCrunch expressed similar skepticism, stating, "That's a big multiple to live up to, and [Facebook] will likely need to add bold new revenue streams to justify the mammoth valuation".

Early investors themselves were said to express similar skepticism. Warning signs before the IPO indicated that several such investors were interested in selling their shares of the company. Accel Partners planned to offload as many as 28% of their shares, while Goldman Sachs was ready to sell up to 50% of theirs. Rolfe Winkler of the Wall Street Journal suggested that, given insider worries, the public should avoid snapping up the stock. Facebook employees were less concerned, with Mark Zuckerberg planning to sell just 6%.

==== Analysis of fundamentals ====
Striking an optimistic tone, The New York Times predicted that the offering would overcome questions about Facebook's difficulties in attracting advertisers to transform the company into a "must-own stock". Jimmy Lee of JPMorgan Chase described it as "the next great blue-chip".

Some analysts expressed concern over Facebook's revenue model; namely, its advertising practices. Brian Wieser of Pivotal Research Group argued that, "Although Facebook is very promising, it's an unproven ad model." To better monetize user involvement, the company could improve advertising. Yet such efforts could undermine user privacy. Also, some advertisers expressed concern over the value of the advertisements they purchased on Facebook. General Motors announced it would pull its $10 million campaign from the social network just days before the IPO. The automobile company asked for "bigger, flashier" advertisements but Facebook refused.

== Public trading ==
In the immediate build-up to the offering, public interest swelled. Some said it is "as much a cultural phenomenon as it is a business story." Meanwhile, Facebook itself celebrated the occasion with an all-night "hackathon" on the night before the IPO. Zuckerberg rang a bell from Hacker Square on Facebook campus in Menlo Park, California, to announce the offering, as is customary for CEOs on the day their companies go public.

=== First day ===
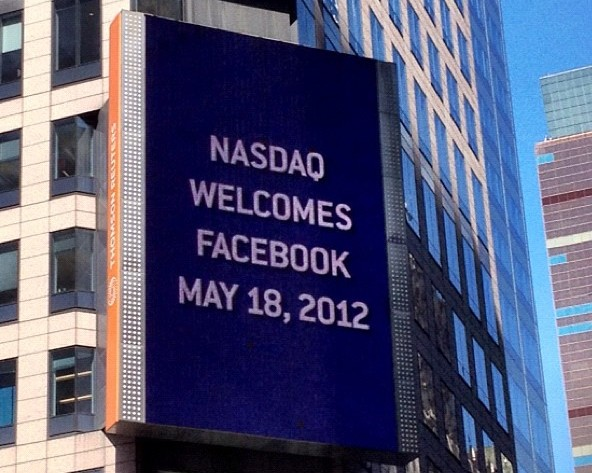
An electronic billboard on the Thomson Reuters building welcomes Facebook to the Nasdaq.

Trading was to begin at 11:00am Eastern Time on Friday, May 18, 2012. However, trading was delayed until 11:30am Eastern Time due to technical problems with the NASDAQ exchange. Those early jitters would foretell ongoing problems; the first day of trading was marred by numerous technical glitches that prevented orders from going through, or even confused investors as to whether or not their orders were successful.

Initial trading saw the stock shoot up to as much as $45. Yet the early rally was unsustainable. The stock struggled to stay above the IPO price for most of the day, forcing underwriters to buy back shares to support the price. Only the aforementioned technical glitches and underwriter support prevented the stock price from falling below the IPO price on the first day of trading.

At closing bell, shares were valued at $38.23, only $0.23 above the IPO price and down $3.82 from the opening bell value. The opening was widely described by the financial press as a disappointment.

Despite technical problems and a relatively low closing value, the stock set a new record for trading volume of an IPO (460 million shares). The IPO also ended up raising $16 billion, making it the third largest in U.S. history (just ahead of AT&T Wireless and behind only General Motors and Visa Inc.). The stock price left the company with a higher market capitalization than all but a few U.S. corporations – surpassing heavyweights such as Amazon.com, McDonald's, Disney, and Kraft Foods – and made Zuckerberg's stock worth $19 billion.

=== Subsequent days ===
Facebook's share value fell during nine of the next thirteen trading days, posting gains during just four. The next day of trading after the IPO (May 21), the stock closed below its offering price, at $34.03. The stock saw another large loss the next day, closing at $31.00. A 'circuit breaker' was used in an attempt to slow down the decline in the stock price. The stock increased modestly in coming days, and Facebook closed its first full week of trading at $31.91. The stock returned to losses for most of its second full week, and had lost over a quarter of its starting value by the end of May. This led the Wall Street Journal to call the IPO a "fiasco." The stock closed its second full week of trading on June 1 at $27.72. By June 6 investors had lost $40 billion. Facebook ended its third full week at $27.10, slightly lower than a week previous. The stock stayed below the $38 mark for months and finally bottomed out in September 2012 below $18.

The shares did not get back to the initial $38 again until August the following year, a full 16 months later.

Significant price moves
Trading days after IPO	Date	Share price at market close	Market capitalization	Daily change	Net change from offering price	Notable event
Offering price	May 18, 2012	$38.00	~$90B	N/A	N/A	IPO
First day	May 18	$38.23	~$90B	▲0.6%	▲0.6%	
1	May 21	$34.03		▼11%	▼10%	
2	May 22	$31.00		▼8.9%	▼18%	
6	May 29	$28.84	$69.17B	▼9.6%	▼24%	
8	May 31	$29.60		▲5%	▼22%	
9	June 1	$27.72		▼6.4%	▼27%	
19	June 15	$30.01		▲6.1%	▼21%	
68	August 20	$20.011		▲5.04%	▼47%	
578	December 20, 2013	$55.12	$140B	▲0.13%	▲45%	Facebook joins S&P 500 index
642	February 19, 2014	$68.06	$173.35B	▲1.13%	▲79%	WhatsApp Purchase Announcement

Price targets for the new stock ranged considerably. On June 4, seven of fifteen analysts polled by FactSet Research suggested prices above the stock's price, effectively advising a "buy." Four of fifteen suggested a "hold," while another four of fifteen suggested "sell." Sanford Bernstein was the lowest of the group, pegging the stock at $25.

On December 11, 2013, Standard & Poor's announced that Facebook would join its S&P 500 index "after the close of trading on December 20," Reuters reported.

== Aftermath ==
=== Financial ===
The IPO had immediate impacts on the stock market. Other technology companies took hits, while the exchanges as a whole saw dampened prices. Investment firms faced considerable losses due to technical glitches. Bloomberg estimated that retail investors may have lost approximately $630 million on Facebook stock since its debut. UBS alone may have lost as much as $350 million. The Nasdaq stock exchange offered $40 million to investment firms plagued by offering-day computer glitches. While considerably higher than the usual $3 million limit on reimbursements, it was unlikely to make up for large investor losses. Additionally, the rival New York Stock Exchange lampooned the move as a "harmful precedent" and an unnecessary subsidy in the wake of Nasdaq's missteps. Nasdaq claimed to fix the problems that beset the offering, and hired IBM for a technical review.

The IPO impacted both Facebook investors and the company itself. It was said to provide healthy rewards for venture capitalists who finally saw the fruits of their labor. In contrast, it was said to negatively affect individual investors such as Facebook employees, who saw once-valuable shares become less lucrative. More generally, the disappointing IPO was said to lower interest in the stock by investors. That would make it more difficult for the company to accumulate cash reserves for large future expenditures such as acquisitions. CBS News said "the Facebook brand takes a pretty big hit for this," mostly because of the public interest that had surrounded the offering.

Some suggested implications for companies other than Facebook specifically. The IPO could jeopardize profits for underwriters who face investors skeptical of the technology industry. In the long-run, the troubled process "makes it harder for the next social-media company that wants to go public." While the Wall Street Journal called for a broad perspective on the issue, they agreed that valuations and funding for future startup IPOs could take a hit. Online travel company Kayak.com delayed its IPO roadshow in the wake of Facebook's troubles. Analyst Trip Chowdhry suggested an even broader conclusion with regards to IPOs, arguing "that hype doesn't sell anymore, short of fundamentals." CBS News compared the situation to the dot-com bubble, warning that "You'd think we all would have learned our lesson" from that period of overvaluation.

While expected to provide significant benefits to Nasdaq, the IPO resulted in a strained relationship between Facebook and the exchange. Facebook has considered moving its listing to a competing exchange.

=== Legal ===
More than 40 lawsuits were filed regarding the Facebook IPO in the month that followed.

Reuters' Alistair Barr reported that Facebook's lead underwriters, Morgan Stanley (MS), JP Morgan (JPM), and Goldman Sachs (GS) all cut their earnings forecasts for the company in the middle of the IPO roadshow. Some have filed lawsuits, alleging that an underwriter for Morgan Stanley selectively revealed adjusted earnings estimates to preferred clients. The remaining underwriters (MS, JPM, GS) and Facebook's CEO and board are also facing litigation. It is believed that adjustments to earnings estimates were communicated to the underwriters by a Facebook financial officer, who in turn used the information to cash out on their positions while leaving the general public with overpriced shares.

Additionally, a class-action lawsuit is being prepared due to the trading glitches, which led to botched orders. Apparently, the glitches prevented a number of investors from selling the stock during the first day of trading while the stock price was falling – forcing them to incur bigger losses when their trades finally went through.

In June 2012, Facebook asked for all the lawsuits to be consolidated into one, because of overlap in their content.

Morgan Stanley settled allegations of improperly influencing research analysts for $5 million in December 2012.

=== Regulatory ===
Facebook's IPO was investigated by the United States Securities and Exchange Commission (SEC) and Financial Industry Regulatory Authority (FINRA) and has been compared to pump and dump schemes. Government officials called for investigations in the following weeks. Securities and Exchange Commission Chairman Mary Schapiro and FINRA chairman Rick Ketchum called for a review of the circumstances surrounding the troubled IPO. On May 22, regulators from Wall Street's FINRA announced that they had begun to investigate whether banks underwriting Facebook had improperly shared information only with select clients, rather than the general public. Massachusetts Secretary of State William Galvin subpoenaed Morgan Stanley over the same issue. The allegations sparked "fury" among some investors and led to the immediate filing of several lawsuits, one of them a class action suit claiming more than $2.5 billion in losses due to the IPO.

==== Secondary exchanges ====
Before the creation of secondary market exchanges like SecondMarket and SharesPost, shares of private companies had very little liquidity; however, this is no longer the case. Facebook employees had been finding private buyers to unload their shares as early as 2007, and when SharesPost launched in 2009, early employees started exiting en masse. Class B shares of Facebook traded as high as $44.50/share ($46.30/share after commissions) on SharesPost prior to the IPO.

=== Reputational ===
The reputation of both Morgan Stanley, the primary IPO underwriter, and NASDAQ were damaged in the fallout from the botched offering.

In interviews with the media, bankers seemed sanguine about the outcome. "We think Morgan has done pretty well on the deal," one person at a bank that was one of Facebook's other underwriters told CNN Money. "Reputation of the bank aside, Facebook hasn't been a bad trade for Morgan." This is because even as the share prices dropped Morgan "racked up big profits" trading the shares.

Morgan's reputation in technology IPOs was "in trouble" after the Facebook offering. Underwriting equity offerings became an important part of Morgan's business after the financial crisis, generating $1.2 billion in fees since 2010. But by signing off on an offering price that was too high, or attempting to sell too many shares to the market, Morgan compounded problems, senior editor for CNN Money Stephen Gandel writes. According to Brad Hintz, an analyst at Sanford Bernstein, "this is something that other banks will be able to use against them when competing for deals."

== See also ==
- Initial public offering of SpaceX
- Initial public offering of Anthropic
