= SECURE Technology Act =

The Strengthening and Enhancing Cyber-capabilities by Utilizing Risk Exposure Technology Act, or SECURE Technology Act, is a United States federal law enacted in 2018. It required the secretary of homeland security to establish a security vulnerability disclosure policy, establish a bug bounty program for DHS, and provides for federal acquisition supply chain security.

Its first title requires DHS to create a policy through which individuals, organizations, and companies can report security vulnerabilities on DHS information systems, along with a process to mitigate or remediate the reported vulnerabilities. Its second title, the Federal Acquisition Supply Chain Security Act of 2018 (FASCSA), created the Federal Acquisition Security Council (FASC), an interagency body designed to address potential security threats posed by information technologies, telecommunications equipment and services, and related hardware and software in the federal supply chain.

The bill was introduced on December 19, 2018, passed the House by a vote of 362–1 that day and cleared the Senate by unanimous consent the next day before being signed into law by President Trump on December 21, 2018. The FASC first issued its regulations in 2021.

As part of the Anthropic–United States Department of Defense dispute, on March 3, 2026, the secretary of defense made a determination under 41 U.S.C. § 4713 that the use of Anthropic products presented a national-security supply-chain risk. On April 8, the DC Circuit denied Anthropic's emergency motion for a stay pending review.
