= Initial public offering of OpenAI =

Planned IPO of American company

The initial public offering (IPO) of OpenAI, an American artificial intelligence company, is planned to occur in 2027. OpenAI filed confidentially for an IPO on June 8, 2026. It was later delayed due to a combination of factors including investor sentiment, the planned IPO of its rival Anthropic and safety incidents of its models.

== Expectations ==
The IPO was initially planned for September and it was expected to be one of the biggest ever. OpenAI was working in May with Goldman Sachs and Morgan Stanley for the starting paperwork.

It announced it was going public one week after Antropic announced similar plans. Richard Crowley from Singapore Management University said that the two IPOs were "intrinsically intertwined through the public's perception of the generative AI space". The company claimed in September they planned to delay their IPO over the capabilities of their models which had caused the rogue agent breach of Hugging Face, the Australian Government's Medicare and mathematical capabilities shown in their bulk release of mathematical papers.

Expectations for the value and for a 2026 IPO were reduced after the collapse of inflated stocks of SpaceX after its IPO. This, and wider anxieties about tech stocks, lowered investor sentiment for the event. Additionally, the planned IPO of Anthropic, a key rival, forced slower financing as its revenue overtook OpenAI in earlier in the year.

Anthropic's IPO is likely to affect investor sentiment for AI and therefore influence the valuation when OpenAI goes public.

In early October, they aimed for a $1.4 trillion valuation, but faced pushback from investors who were wary of investing before seeing Anthropic's IPO. In anticipation, it raised $30 billion at a $1.25 trillion valuation in an October 2026 funding round.
