= Anthropic–United States Department of Defense dispute =

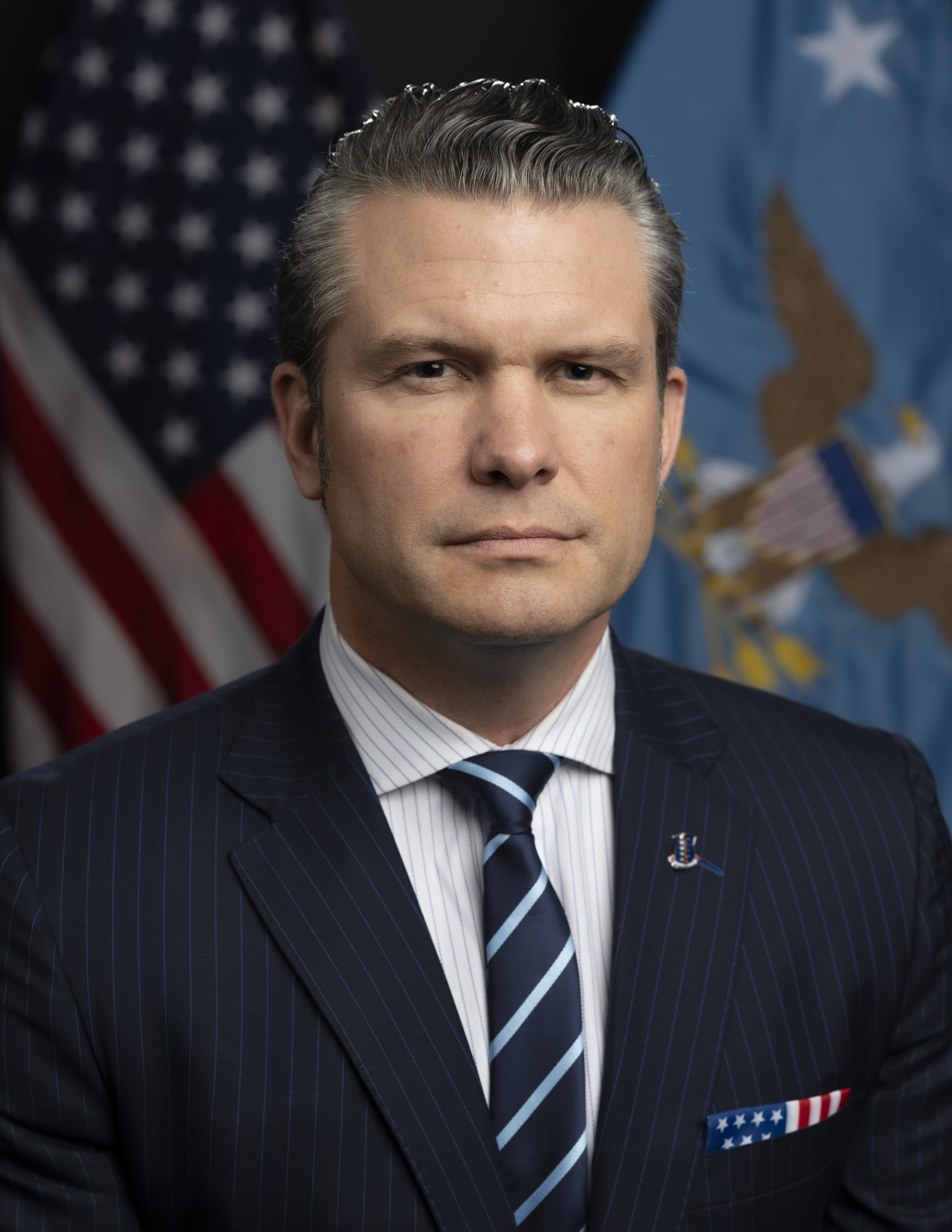
Pete Hegseth

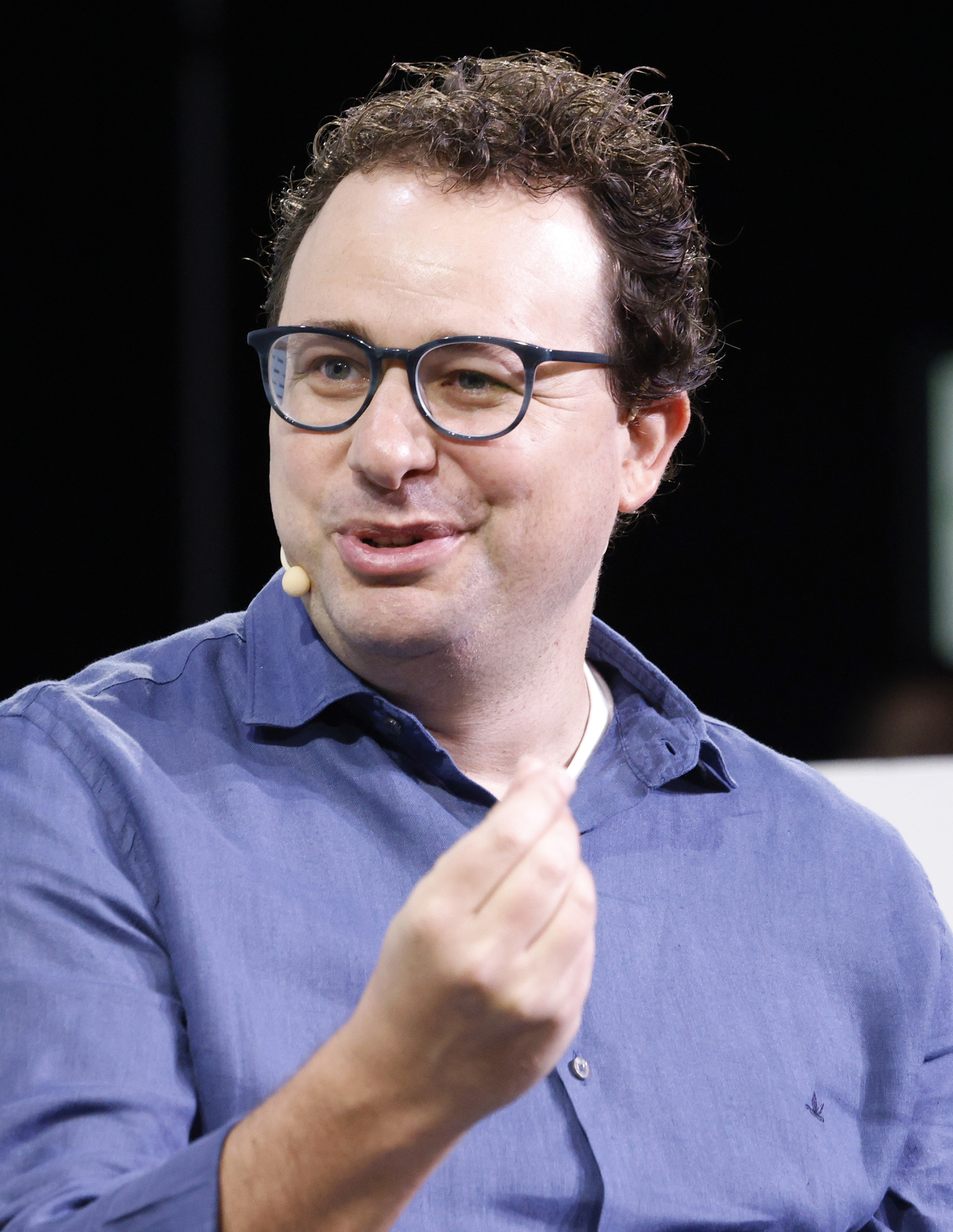
Dario Amodei

Hegseth, the United States secretary of defense, has publicly rebuked Anthropic chief executive Dario Amodei's approach to artificial intelligence.

Since January 2026, the United States Department of Defense (DoD) has conflicted with the artificial intelligence company Anthropic over the use of its products for military purposes and mass domestic surveillance.

In September, the DoD stated it has "ceased the use of Anthropic products", including their removal from Palantir's Maven Smart System.

== Background ==
=== Artificial intelligence in the U.S. military ===
The United States Department of Defense began developing lethal autonomous weapons as early as the Reagan administration. The Department of Defense established a policy on the use of artificial intelligence in 2012, Directive 3000.09. Efforts to utilize artificial intelligence intensified under the term of Secretary Ash Carter. The Department of Defense's use of artificial intelligence for Project Maven prompted concerns within Google in 2018, leading to protests and mass resignations.

=== Anthropic in the second Trump administration ===
In Donald Trump's second presidency, Anthropic publicly disagreed with the administration's policies and initiatives. In January 2025, Anthropic CEO Dario Amodei criticized the artificial intelligence investment project Stargate as "chaotic" and opposed Trump's rescission of president Joe Biden's Executive Order on Artificial Intelligence, but noted that Anthropic had held discussions with Trump officials about artificial intelligence policy. Amid discussions over the One Big Beautiful Bill Act, Anthropic privately lobbied for Congress to vote against a bill preventing states from regulating artificial intelligence and expressed opposition to an artificial intelligence agreement signed among Gulf states in Trump's visit to the Middle East in May. According to Semafor, Trump officials chastised Anthropic's hiring of several officials involved in the Biden administration, including Elizabeth Kelly, the former director of the Artificial Intelligence Safety Institute; Tarun Chhabra, the coordinator for technology and national security in the National Security Council; and Ben Buchanan, Biden's advisor for artificial intelligence. The following month, Amodei wrote an op-ed in The New York Times describing the artificial intelligence regulation bill, then tied to the One Big Beautiful Bill Act, as "far too blunt an instrument".

Prior to the dispute, the Trump administration had integrated Anthropic's services. By November 2024, Anthropic had already partnered with Palantir and Amazon Web Services, companies that offered services with FedRAMP authorization. In the Biden administration, Anthropic had reached an agreement with the AI Safety Institute and had participated in a nuclear information safety evaluation. The Department of Homeland Security authorized its workers to use commercial artificial intelligence systems, including Anthropic's Claude, until May 2025. Through its interoperability with Palantir, a company heavily involved in data analysis and analytics at the Department of Defense, Anthropic's technology achieved relatively widespread usage in the U.S. military. The following month, Anthropic announced that it would allow national security customers to use Claude Gov. Anthropic's orthogonal usage policy to the surveillance systems implemented at the Federal Bureau of Investigation, the Secret Service, and Immigration and Customs Enforcement led to a conflict between Anthropic and the Trump administration by September. That month, Amodei criticized Trump's approach to export restrictions on semiconductors.

Anthropic's strategy has mirrored Amodei's views toward Trump; in a Facebook post ahead of the 2024 presidential election, Amodei urged his associates to vote for vice president Kamala Harris over Trump, describing him as a "feudal warlord". As the Trump administration targeted law firms, Amodei cut ties with the firms Skadden, Arps, Slate, Meagher & Flom and Latham & Watkins, which reached agreements with the Trump administration to avoid punishment. David Sacks, Trump's advisor for artificial intelligence and cryptocurrency, said on All-In (2020–present) that Anthropic was among several "AI doomers" that support regulation he saw as overly restrictive. According to The Wall Street Journal, officials close to Sacks examined whether Anthropic's Claude was a "woke AI"; in July, Trump signed an executive order "Preventing Woke AI in the Federal Government ".

Sacks viewed Amodei's decision to attend the World Economic Forum over Trump's second inauguration; his hiring of Biden officials; and Anthropic's association with the philanthropic initiative Open Philanthropy as evidence that Anthropic would not support Trump's agenda. In October 2025, Sacks stated that Anthropic was "running a sophisticated regulatory capture strategy based on fear-mongering." That month, Amodei published a blog post rebuffing "inaccurate claims" from the Trump administration on Anthropic's policies, intensifying the dispute. Amodei's statement included views explicitly espoused by vice president JD Vance. In December, Amodei met with Trump officials and several senators in an effort to improve Anthropic's relationship with the Trump administration.

== Dispute ==
In December 2025, secretary of defense Pete Hegseth announced GenAI.mil, an artificial intelligence platform for the Department of Defense. The department initially contracted Google Gemini for the platform, then OpenAI's ChatGPT. The following month, Hegseth announced that the Department of Defense would additionally contract xAI's Grok for use in the military, decrying "woke AI".

In January 2026, Semafor reported that the Department of Defense had conflicted with Anthropic over its policies on lethal military force and that Hegseth's comment on woke AI was a reference to Anthropic. According to Reuters, Anthropic representatives opposed the use of the company's products for surveillance or to develop lethal autonomous weapons. The dispute between Anthropic and the Department of Defense resulted in the termination of a contract worth an estimated US$200 million.

In February 2026, Emil Michael, the under secretary of defense for research and engineering, stated that the Department of Defense would expand access to commercial artificial intelligence systems, including Anthropic's Claude, to unclassified and classified domains. That month, Axios reported that the Department of Defense had used Claude in the United States intervention in Venezuela. Anthropic told Axios that it would reassess its partnership with the Department of Defense after the revelations. After Anthropic refused to agree to allow the Department of Defense to use Claude for "all lawful purposes", the department threatened to cancel its contracts with the company. Hegseth additionally moved to label Anthropic a "supply chain risk", which would have forced military contractors to cut ties with Anthropic. A federal judge blocked most of this designation, describing it as punitive. The D.C. Circuit denied Anthropic's emergency motion for a stay of the FASCSA designation in April so it remains in effect for covered systems.

Michael told reporters that Anthropic should "cross the Rubicon" and allow the Department of Defense to dictate the terms of how its technology is used. The position of the Department of Defense, and its tactics during the dispute, were widely criticized on grounds including violating the principles of rule-of-law, market independence and national security.

In a June 2026 Bloomberg interview about Claude’s reported role in U.S. military targeting systems, Amodei said Anthropic did not know whether Claude had been used in connection with the Minab school strike, but that, if it had, the use case would not violate Anthropic’s red lines. The exchange concerned the 2026 Minab school strike, which Amnesty International described as an unlawful U.S. strike that killed 156 people, including 120 children, and which Human Rights Watch said should be investigated as a war crime.

== Impact ==
The dispute caused 1789 Capital, a venture capital firm associated with Donald Trump Jr., to abandon an investment in Anthropic worth hundreds of millions of dollars.

Following the government's actions against Anthropic, OpenAI "rushed", hours before the US started the 2026 Iran war, to get a deal without the constraints that Anthropic had sought.

As of late April, notwithstanding the ND Cal. injunction, "DoW contract cancellations proceed, removal of Claude from DoW systems continues on a 180-day timeline, and Anthropic cannot be used as a prime contractor or subcontractor on DoW covered systems."

== Lawsuits ==
Anthropic PBC v. Department of War
- Court: Northern District of California
- Started: March 9, 2026
- Docket nos.: 3:26-cv-01996

Court membership
- Judge sitting: Rita F. Lin

In March 2026, a federal judge in California, Rita F. Lin, granted a preliminary injunction against the government. Lin wrote:

The Department of War’s records show that it designated Anthropic as a supply chain risk because of its "hostile manner through the press." Punishing Anthropic for bringing public scrutiny to the government’s contracting position is classic illegal First Amendment retaliation. (...) At bottom, Anthropic has shown that these broad punitive measures were likely unlawful and that it is suffering irreparable harm from them. Numerous amici have also described wide-ranging harm to the public interest, including the chilling of open discussion about important topics in AI safety.

Lin ruled in August 2026 that the blacklisting was illegal.

Anthropic PBC v. United States Department of War
- Court: United States Court of Appeals for the District of Columbia Circuit
- Started: March 9, 2026; 8 months ago
- Docket nos.: 26-1049

In April 2026, the Court of Appeals for the D.C. Circuit in a per curiam order denied Anthropic's motion to lift the FASCSA designation. The April order is not final. The court's order said lifting the designation "would force the United States military to prolong its dealings with an unwanted vendor of critical AI services in the middle of a significant ongoing military conflict". According to Wired, "Several experts in government contracting and corporate rights" said "Anthropic has a strong case against the government, but the courts sometimes refuse to overrule the White House on matters related to national security."

== See also ==
- Artificial intelligence controversies
