= Chris Olah =

Canadian machine learning researcher (born 1991 or 1992)

- Born: 1991 or 1992 (age 33–34)
- Citizenship: Canadian
- Education: University of Toronto (attended)
- Known for: Mechanistic interpretability; neural network interpretability and visualization; DeepDream; activation atlases
- Scientific career
- Fields: Machine learning
- Workplaces: Anthropic; OpenAI; Google Brain

Christopher Olah (born 1991 or 1992) is a Canadian machine learning researcher and a co-founder of Anthropic. He is known for his work on neural network interpretability, particularly mechanistic interpretability, and for research and tools that visualise internal representations in neural networks. In 2025, Forbes reported he had become a billionaire due to his ownership in Anthropic.

== Early life ==
Olah was born in Canada and graduated from The Abelard School in Toronto.He studied mathematics at the University of Toronto for one year before dropping out. According to an interview with Wired magazine, he left university at age 18 without earning a degree to "support a friend accused of terrorism". In 2012, he received a Thiel Fellowship, which supported him in pursuing independent work.

== Career ==
Olah has worked on interpretability research at Google Brain, OpenAI, and Anthropic. He started as an intern at Google Brain in 2015, working his way up to a research scientist. In 2017, Olah co-founded an interactive machine learning publication, Distill, with the goal of creating more transparency surrounding machine learning. A paper published in Distill led Olah to a job at OpenAI.

In 2018, he left Google Brain to lead OpenAI's interpretability team. In 2020, he left OpenAI and co-founded Anthropic a year later.

=== Vatican address on AI ethics ===
On May 25, 2026, Olah spoke at the Vatican during the official presentation of Magnifica Humanitas, the first encyclical of Pope Leo XIV, which addresses artificial intelligence and human dignity.

Olah said AI could lead to large-scale displacement of human labor and exacerbate global inequality. He said the commercial and geopolitical incentives driving frontier AI labs often conflict with the public good, and described AI systems as "grown" rather than strictly engineered. Olah called for external moral oversight from religious institutions, scholars, and civil society to hold the technology sector accountable.

=== Recognition ===
Time called him one of the pioneers of mechanistic interpretability and noted that he pursued this research line first at Google, then at OpenAI, and later at Anthropic, which he co-founded.

Wired reported that Olah was involved in neural network visualisation work including DeepDream in 2015, as part of efforts to better understand what neural networks learn. Later coverage linked him to more structured interpretability approaches such as "activation atlases". The Verge covered activation atlases as a collaboration between Google and OpenAI researchers to help inspect neural network representations.

At Anthropic, Olah has been identified in major press coverage as leading interpretability work aimed at mapping internal "features" in large language models and relating interpretability findings to AI safety. Quanta Magazine has also quoted Olah in reporting on interpretability and the internal structure of modern language models.

Time included Olah in its TIME100 AI list in 2024.

Olah was included on the Haute Living San Francisco list of Haute 100 AI Leaders in 2025.
