= Caitlin Kalinowski =

American product designer, mechanical engineer

- Education: Stanford University (BS Mechanical Engineering, 2007)
- Known for: Head of hardware, Oculus VR; Robotics and consumer hardware initiatives, OpenAI
- Scientific career
- Fields: Product design, mechanical engineering
- Workplaces: OQO; Apple; Facebook; Oculus VR; OpenAI

Caitlin Kalinowski is an American product designer and mechanical engineer. From November 2024 to March 2026, she led the robotics and consumer hardware initiatives at OpenAI. Prior to that, she was the head of hardware at virtual reality technology company Oculus VR.

== Personal life ==
Caitlin Kalinowski grew up in New Hampshire. She moved to the west coast, and began attending Stanford University to study product design. Her parents were both professors. She lives in San Francisco, California.

Kalinowski is involved with various women's and lesbians' technology groups focused on increasing awareness and resources for women in the technology fields. She is on the board of Wogrammer, a project focused on sharing interviews of women engineers, and the advisory board of Lesbians Who Tech.

== Career ==
After three years at Stanford University, Kalinowski left to begin working at OQO, where she worked on the OQO model 02. She later left OQO for Apple, where she worked as a technical lead on the design of laptops in the MacBook product line. While continuing to work half-time at Apple, she returned to Stanford and in 2007 received her bachelor's degree in mechanical engineering. She left Apple to work at Facebook, where she worked on the Facebook Bluetooth Beacon project. After Facebook acquired Oculus VR, Kalinowski joined the company as the head of product design. In 2018 she became the acting head of hardware for Oculus, where she worked on the Oculus Go, Santa Cruz prototype, Oculus Rift and the other virtual reality products developed by the company.

In 2018 she was listed as one of the most powerful female engineers by Business Insider.

She was a featured speaker at WISMP Summit 2018, held in San Francisco on February 3, 2018.

In 2021 and 2022, she was included on the Fast Company Queer 50 list.

In November 2024, Kalinowski joined OpenAI to lead the company's robotics and consumer hardware initiatives.

In March 2026, she resigned from OpenAI, citing ethical concerns with OpenAI's agreement with the Department of Defense. In a social media post on X, she wrote that "surveillance of Americans without judicial oversight and lethal autonomy without human authorization are lines that deserved more deliberation than they got."
