= Anthropic =

American artificial intelligence company

Anthropic, PBC

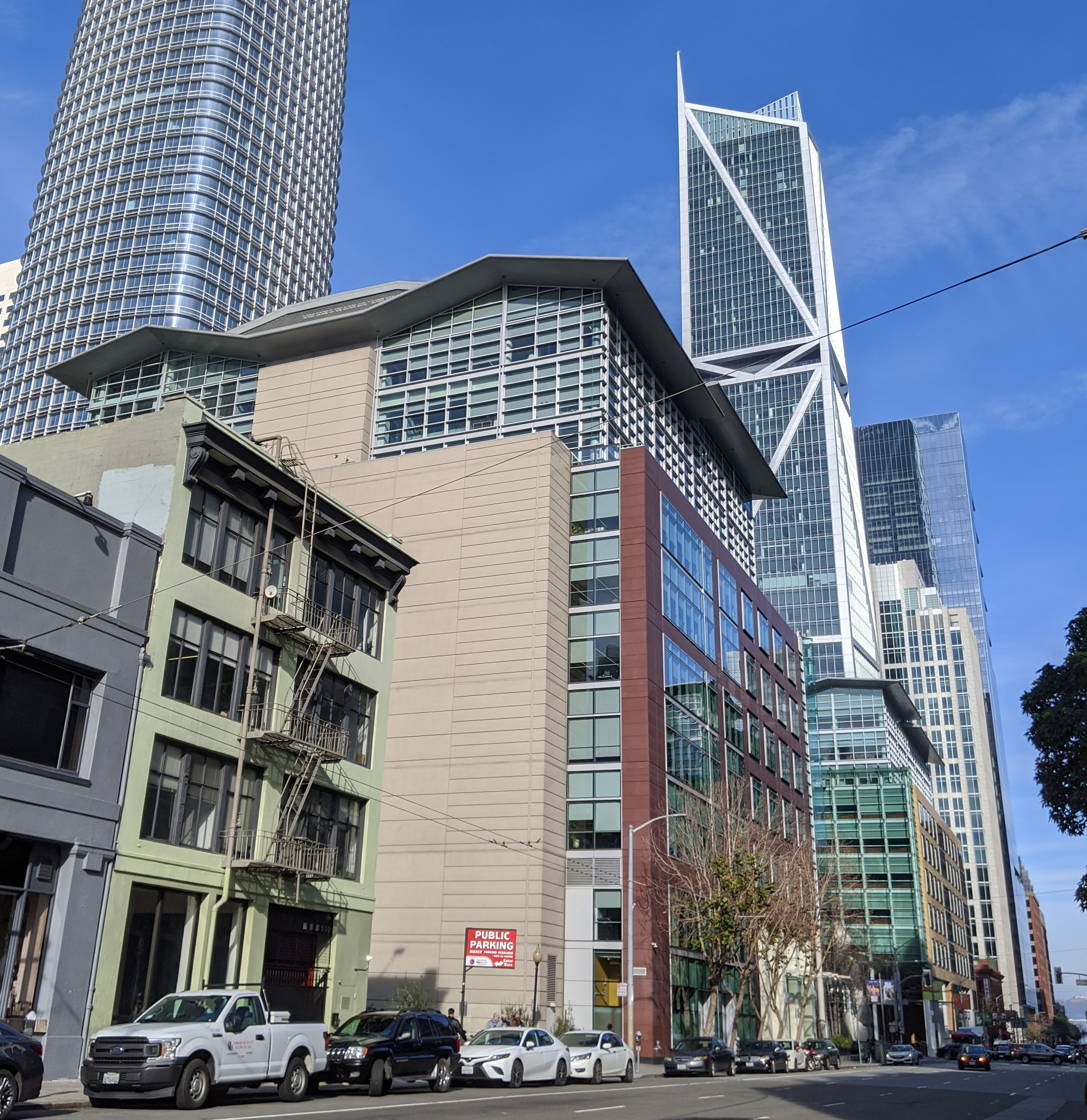
- Headquarters at 500 Howard Street, San Francisco
- Type: Publicly-listed public benefit corporation
- Traded as: Nasdaq: ANT
- Industry: Artificial intelligence
- Founded: January 26, 2021 (5 years ago)
- Founders: Dario Amodei; Daniela Amodei; Jared Kaplan; Jack Clark; Chris Olah; Ben Mann; Sam McCandlish; Tom Brown
- Headquarters: San Francisco, California, U.S.
- Key people: Dario Amodei (CEO); Daniela Amodei (President and chairwoman); Ami Vora (CPO); Mariano-Florentino Cuéllar (Chief Global Affairs Officer)
- Products: Claude; Claude Code; Claude Design; Claude Duet
- Revenue: ▲US$33.24 billion (2026)
- Net income: ▼US$-42 billion (2025)
- Total assets: 147,358,000,000 United States dollar (2026)
- Number of employees: 5,300 (September 2026)
- Website: anthropic.com

Anthropic, PBC (stylized as ANTHROP\C and A\) is an American artificial intelligence (AI) public benefit corporation headquartered in San Francisco, California. Its flagship product is Claude, a series of proprietary large language models (LLMs). In January 2021, Anthropic was founded by former members of OpenAI over disagreements on AI safety, including siblings Daniela Amodei and Dario Amodei, who are president and CEO, respectively. Valued at $965 billion in a May 2026 Series H capital raise, it is the world's most valuable AI pure play. The company went public in November 2026.

Anthropic develops the LLM Claude in four tiers: Fable, Opus, Sonnet, and Haiku. Claude is accessible via an online chatbot, an API, and Anthropic's agent harnesses: Claude Code, Cowork, Design, and Science. Its model class Claude Mythos, a less restricted version of Fable, is available only to approved US organizations with a cybersecurity and life sciences focus. Anthropic's Project Panama buys and destructively scans millions of books to provide training data for Claude. Before Project Panama, Anthropic downloaded pirated books and was sued, settling in 2025 a copyright infringement lawsuit from authors for $1.5 billion.

Anthropic conducts LLM research including on mechanistic interpretability, safety, alignment, and societal impact. Notable researchers working at Anthropic include Andrej Karpathy, John M. Jumper, Jan Leike, Chris Olah, Amanda Askell, and Levent Alpöge.

Anthropic's organizational culture is influenced by effective altruism and the rationalist community. Anthropic describes advanced AI as a potential existential risk to humanity. Along with other major frontier AI companies, it has faced repeated protests from those who favor banning the development of superintelligence.

In business, Anthropic partners with cloud providers including Palantir. From 2024, Claude was used by the US Department of Defense (DoD) and the Intelligence Community. In 2026, Claude was used in the Iran war and the US intervention in Venezuela. In February, the DoD demanded the use of Claude for all lawful purposes, but Anthropic refused to drop restrictions against mass domestic surveillance and fully autonomous weapons. The dispute led the Trump administration to phase out Anthropic products from government use; the DoD completed this in October.

== History ==
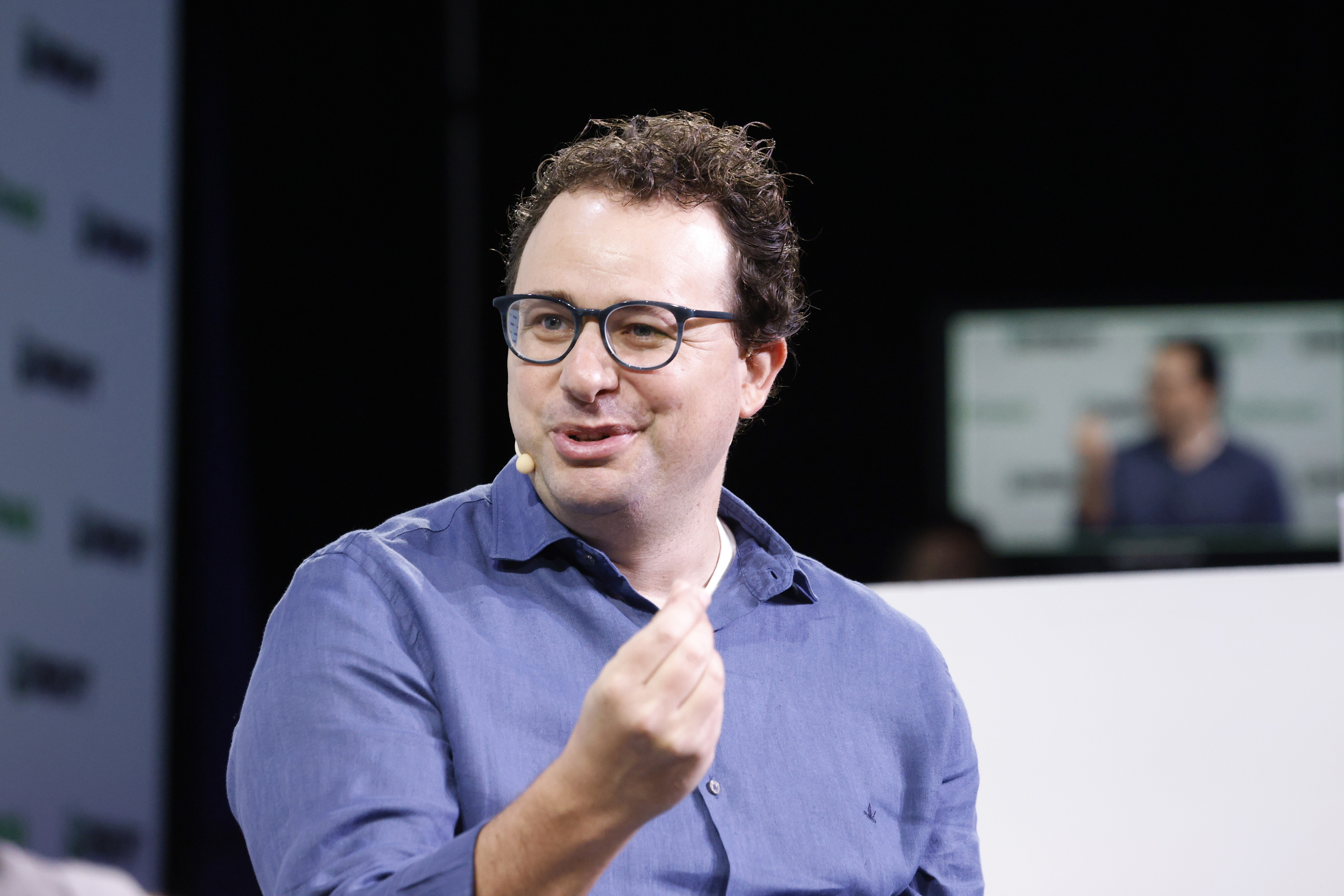
Dario Amodei, co-founder and CEO

Anthropic was founded in January 2021 by seven former employees of OpenAI, including siblings Daniela Amodei and Dario Amodei, the latter of whom was OpenAI's Vice President of Research. They raised $124 million in May 2021. In the summer of 2022, Anthropic finished training the first version of Claude but did not immediately release it, citing a need for further internal safety testing and a desire to avoid initiating a potentially hazardous race to develop increasingly powerful AI systems. It was released in March 2023.

In 2024, Anthropic hired several notable employees from OpenAI, including Jan Leike and John Schulman. In May 2025, the company announced Claude 4. It also introduced new API capabilities, including the Model Context Protocol (MCP) connector. The company hosted its inaugural developer conference that month. Also in May, Anthropic launched a web search API that enables Claude to access real-time information from the internet. Claude Code, Anthropic's coding assistant, transitioned from research preview to general availability.

In July 2025, Anthropic signed a two-year contract with the US Department of Defense for $200 million. Anthropic LLMs became integrated with the Pentagon's classified intelligence networks and with Palantir's data platform. Anthropic stipulated that the Pentagon not use its technologies for mass surveillance of Americans, or to create fully autonomous weapons. Amodei clarified that Anthropic supports the use of AI in "lawful foreign intelligence and counterintelligence missions" and partially autonomous weapons, such as those used in the Russo-Ukrainian war.

In September 2025, Anthropic announced that it would stop selling its products to groups majority-owned by Chinese, Russian, Iranian, or North Korean entities due to national security concerns. In October 2025, Anthropic announced a cloud partnership with Google, giving it access to up to one million of Google's custom Tensor Processing Units (TPUs), potentially adding more than one gigawatt of AI compute capacity by 2026. In November, Nvidia and Microsoft were expected to invest up to $15 billion in Anthropic, and Anthropic said it would buy $30 billion of computing capacity from Microsoft Azure running on Nvidia AI systems.

In November 2025, Anthropic said that hackers sponsored by the Chinese government used Claude to perform automated cyberattacks against around 30 global organizations. The hackers bypassed Anthropic's safeguards by pretending it was for defensive testing. In December 2025, Anthropic acquired Bun to improve Claude Code's speed and stability. The same month, Anthropic signed a multi-year, $200 million partnership with Snowflake Inc. to make Claude models available through that company's platform.

Claude was reportedly used during the 2026 United States intervention in Venezuela. In February 2026, Anthropic aired two commercials during Super Bowl LX as part of a broader marketing campaign called "A Time and a Place", with four ads created by Mother. Each ad depicts AI assistants suddenly pivoting to promoting a fictional product in the middle of a conversation. Anthropic said that Claude will stay ad-free, in contrast to its competitor OpenAI, which introduced ads to the free version of ChatGPT. The same month, Anthropic donated $20 million to Public First Action, an AI regulation advocacy group.

On February 23, 2026, Anthropic accused Chinese competitors DeepSeek, Moonshot AI, and MiniMax Group of "distillation attacks" in violation of Anthropic's terms of service. Anthropic alleged the companies in total generated over 16 million chats with Claude using around 24,000 fraudulent accounts, which were then used as training data. In June 2026, Anthropic accused Alibaba Cloud of similar practices.

In 2026, Anthropic refused the United States Department of Defense's (DoD) demand to remove contractual restrictions prohibiting the use of its AI technology for surveillance and autonomous weapons. After the refusal, the DoD designated the company a "supply chain risk" and barred all U.S. military private contractors, suppliers, and partners from doing business with the firm (see Anthropic–United States Department of Defense dispute). At the outset of the 2026 Iran war, the US military used Claude to identify and rank targets in Iran according to their strategic importance, to generate strike sequences, and to write legal justifications for the strikes.

In May 2026, Anthropic announced a deal with xAI for use of its Colossus 1 data center to expand its model capacity. On May 18, the company acquired software startup Stainless for an undisclosed sum. It also made a $1.8 billion cloud computing deal with Akamai Technologies. Also in May, The New York Times reported that Anthropic was seeking to file an initial public offering (IPO), with a target of debuting in the fall of 2026. On June 1, Anthropic announced it had filed confidential IPO papers with the United States Securities and Exchange Commission, and on October 26 it released a public IPO filing ahead of the move. The IPO filings included 94 pages dedicated to risk factors including a "catastrophic AI-related event" so large it couldn't get insurance to cover potential damages.

On April 7, 2026, Anthropic announced Claude Mythos as its most advanced model. With capabilities in cybersecurity and biosecurity, it was not planned for public release. Fable 5, a "Mythos-class model" with extended guardrails around these topics, was also announced on June 9. On June 12, Anthropic suspended all access to its Claude Fable 5 and Mythos 5 models due to national security concerns from US government authorities. On June 26, the US government reversed part of its earlier restrictions, allowing Anthropic to provide its Claude Mythos 5 model to selected users, including more than 100 approved US organizations and vetted foreign nationals. The ban was lifted on June 30, and user access to Claude Fable 5 and Mythos 5 was restored on July 1.

In July 2026, TeraWulf Inc. announced that Anthropic had signed a 20-year lease for a data center in development on a campus called Justified Data in Hawesville, Kentucky. AMD announced a partnership with Anthropic for 2 gigawatts of their AMD Instinct MI450 GPUs, with AMD adopting Claude and investing up to $5 billion in Anthropic.

In August 2026, Anthropic agreed to a cloud-computing agreement with Nscale reportedly valued at approximately $45 billion. Under the agreement, Anthropic would lease about 460 megawatts of computing capacity at an Nscale data center development in West Virginia, which is expected to become operational in late 2027. The facility is expected to use Nvidia's Vera Rubin chips.

In September 2026, Anthropic announced that it would give independent evaluators permanent, employee-like access to its AI models so they could verify whether the company was following its stated safety practices, with Accenture (which acquired AI software and services company Faculty in early 2026) announced as its first evaluator. CEO Dario Amodei described the arrangement as similar to having a food inspector independently evaluate a company. The same month, The Wall Street Journal reported that Anthropic now plans an initial public offering in November 2026. On October 26, 2026, Anthropic filed an S-1 report with the United States Securities and Exchange Commission in preparation for its upcoming IPO.

Reuters reported the IPO could value the company at $2 trillion. Some analysts estimate the IPO could raise up to $100 billion, which would make it the largest IPO in history. In November 2026, Bloomberg reported the company was seeking to raise up to $90 billion in public and private offerings at a fully diluted valuation of $1.4 trillion. Later reporting suggested the IPO was said to be "multiple times oversubscribed".

Anthropic offered 980 million Class A shares at $83 a share in the offering, priced on November 18, 2026, with trading due to begin on November 19 on the Nasdaq Global Select Market under the ticker ANT. Alongside the IPO, the company raised $26 billion through a concurrent private placement from Nvidia, Alphabet and Google, Microsoft, AMD, Broadcom, Micron and TSMC, all buying at the IPO price. When market opened, the shares began trading at $111.50, giving the company a valuation of over $2 trillion. The price dropped throughout the day and closed at $97.

== Company culture ==
Anthropic's culture and the worldview of its CEO, Dario Amodei, are influenced by effective altruism and the rationalist community. Anthropic says that advanced AI could represent an existential risk to humanity. Along with other major frontier AI companies, it has faced repeated protests from those who favor banning the development of superintelligence.

== Business structure ==
Anthropic's corporate structure before the IPO

According to Anthropic, its goal is to research AI systems' safety and reliability. The Amodei siblings were among those who left OpenAI due to directional differences. Anthropic operates as a public benefit corporation, which, under its charter, requires its directors to balance the financial interests of shareholders with the company’s public benefit purpose.

The company’s shares are divided into the following classes:

Class	Number	Owner	Voting rights	Economic participation
A	7,58 bn	Publicly traded	1 vote per share, but a total of only 49.9% of the voting rights	Yes
N	5,64 bn	Strategic partners	No	Yes (they convert into Class A shares upon sale)
E	0 (tbc)	Employees	No	No
T	1	Long-Term Benefit Trust	No, but it elects the majority (4) of the directors.	No
F	1	Founders	Majority (50.1%) of the voting rights and elects the remaining (3) directors	No

Anthropic's Long-Term Benefit Trust (LTBT) is a non-profit purpose trust whose goal is to "responsibly develop and maintain advanced AI for the long-term benefit of humanity." The trust holds the Class T shares of the PBC, which allow it to elect a majority of the directors to Anthropic’s board, thereby ensuring operational control over the company. The remaining board members are elected by the seven founders (via their investment vehicle, Founder LLC, which holds the Class F shares), who also retain a majority of the voting rights for all other decisions, while publicly traded shares carry only a minority of the voting rights.

In January 2026, Anthropic introduced a division called "Labs", co-led by Mike Krieger, formerly the company's chief product officer. In March 2026, Anthropic launched the Anthropic Institute, a think tank studying AI, led by Jack Clark. As of October 19, 2026, Eric Schmidt owned a 1% stake in Anthropic.

The Wall Street Journal stated that at Anthropic, Daniela Amodei "oversees day-to-day operations and manages the executive team", while Dario Amodei serves as "ideological leader", with only one direct report.

=== Notable employees ===
- Dario Amodei: co-founder and CEO
- Daniela Amodei: co-founder and president
- Amanda Askell: philosopher working on Claude's character
- Nicholas Carlini: researcher
- Jack Clark: co-founder, head of public benefit, former head of policy
- Jared Kaplan: co-founder and chief science officer
- Mike Krieger: Chief Product Officer
- Jan Leike: co-lead of the Alignment Science team, former OpenAI alignment researcher
- Chris Olah: co-founder, interpretability research
- Andrej Karpathy: researcher
- John M. Jumper: Nobel Prize laureate, formerly at DeepMind
- Levent Alpöge: researcher in mathematics
- Ben Bernanke: economist and trustee of the LTBT
- Richard Fontaine: political researcher and trustee of the LTBT
- Christopher Stubbs: physicist and trustee of the LTBT

=== Board of directors ===
As of November 2026, the company's board consisted of the following persons:

- Dario Amodei: co-founder and CEO
- Daniela Amodei: co-founder and president
- Yasmin Razavi: General Partner at Spark Capital
- Reed Hastings: co-founder of Netflix, Inc.
- Chris Liddell: businessman and former White House deputy chief of staff in the first Trump administration.
- Vas Narasimhan: CEO of Novartis

== Product ==
Claude

- Screenshot of a Claude start page in dark mode
- Developer: Anthropic
- Type: Large language model; Chatbot; Generative pre-trained transformer; Foundation model
- Website: claude.ai

Anthropic's flagship product line is the "Claude" series of large language models, which some employees believe is a reference to mathematician Claude Shannon. One of the techniques used to fine-tune Claude models is called "constitutional AI", in which the LLM is trained to adhere to a set of principles called a constitution. The company makes the models available via a web interface, an API, iOS and Android apps, Linux, Mac and Windows desktop apps, and cloud computing platforms including Amazon Bedrock, Google Cloud Vertex AI, and Palantir.

Claude Code is a command-line AI agent designed for coding. "Cowork" is an equivalent with a graphical user interface, intended to be simpler to use. While Claude Code is tailored toward developers, Cowork is designed for non-technical users, enabling them to automate file and task management (including reading, editing and writing new files) without requiring programming knowledge.

With the advent of Claude Code, vibe coding, a programming approach in which users describe desired outcomes in natural language and let an AI agent write the code, became increasingly popular. The term was coined by AI researcher Andrej Karpathy in February 2025 and rapidly gained popularity as AI coding tools became more ubiquitous.

== Finances ==
Revenue and Profits (in millions USD)
Year	Revenue $	Net income $
2023	41	-1,531
2024	386	-8,309
2025	4,585	-41,965
2026H1	16,286	-80,748

In April 2022, Anthropic announced it had received $580 million in funding, including a $500 million investment from FTX under the leadership of Sam Bankman-Fried. In September 2023, Amazon announced a partnership with Anthropic. Amazon became a minority stakeholder by initially investing $1.25 billion and planning a total investment of $4 billion. The remaining $2.75 billion was invested in March 2024.

In November 2024, Amazon invested another $4 billion, doubling its total investment. As part of the deal, Anthropic uses Amazon Web Services (AWS) as its primary cloud provider and makes its AI models available to AWS customers.

In October 2023, Google invested $500 million in Anthropic and committed to an additional $1.5 billion over time. In March 2025, Google agreed to invest another $1 billion in Anthropic. Anthropic raised $3.5 billion in a Series E funding round in March 2025, achieving a post-money valuation of $61.5 billion, led by Lightspeed Venture Partners with participation by several major investors.

In September 2025, Anthropic completed a Series F funding round, raising $13 billion at a post-money valuation of $183 billion. The round was co-led by Iconiq Capital, Fidelity Management & Research, and Lightspeed Venture Partners, with participation by the Qatar Investment Authority and other investors. On December 31, 2025, it was confirmed that Anthropic had signed a term sheet for a $10 billion funding round led by Coatue and GIC, at a $350 billion valuation.

On February 12, 2026, Anthropic announced that it had raised $30 billion in a Series G funding round, bringing its post-money valuation to $380 billion. In May 2026, Anthropic announced it had raised $65 billion of investment from multiple investors, including Altimeter Capital, Dragoneer Investment Group, and Sequoia Capital. The investment round valued the company at $965 billion.

In May 2026, Anthropic, in collaboration with Blackstone, Hellman & Friedman, Goldman Sachs, and others, created Ode, a company that offers AI services to other companies.

In October 2026, Anthropic announced it would commit 5% of its shares to a "public benefit fund".

According to its October 2026 IPO filing, Anthropic had lost some $80 billion in the first half of 2026, net of revenue ($16.3B), but most of that was paper losses due to the increased value of convertible bonds. The company claimed to have posted a positive operating result in the second quarter of 2026.

== Projects ==
=== U.S. military and intelligence ===
In November 2024, Anthropic partnered with Palantir and Amazon Web Services to provide the Claude model to U.S. intelligence and defense agencies. In June 2025, Anthropic announced a "Claude Gov" model. Ars Technica reported that as of June 2025, it was in use at multiple U.S. national security agencies. As of February 2026, Anthropic's partnership with Palantir makes Claude the only AI model used in classified missions. In July 2025, the United States Department of Defense (DoD) announced that Anthropic had received a $200 million contract for AI in the military, along with Google, OpenAI, and xAI.

According to The Wall Street Journal, the U.S. military used Claude in its 2026 raid on Venezuela to capture President Nicolás Maduro. Exactly how Claude was used is unknown. The intervention resulted in the deaths of 83 people. Anthropic's usage policy prohibits directly using Claude for domestic surveillance or in fully autonomous weapons. White House officials said that these restrictions prevented federal contractors working with the FBI and Secret Service from using it. Tension regarding this policy has arisen with The Pentagon and the Trump administration.

On February 24, 2026, Defense Secretary Pete Hegseth threatened to cut Anthropic out of the DoD supply chain by February 27 if Anthropic did not permit unrestricted use of Claude, or he would invoke the Defense Production Act to assert unrestricted use without an agreement. On February 26, Anthropic rejected the Pentagon's demands to drop AI safeguards. On February 27, after the deadline, President Donald Trump ordered U.S. government agencies to stop using models developed by Anthropic. The action was described as retaliatory.

Two days later, it was reported that the US military had used Claude via Palantir's Maven Smart System during its attacks on Iran at the outset of the 2026 Iran war. It was later announced that the Pentagon was investigating whether Claude played a role in the U.S. strike on the Iranian girls' school that killed more than 170 people, mostly children. On March 5, the Pentagon officially deemed Anthropic a supply chain risk, a decision the company said it saw "no choice but to challenge ... in court". In March, leaders from Google, Amazon, Apple, and Microsoft supported Anthropic's lawsuit against the DoD.

On March 11, a Pentagon memo revealed its decision that Anthropic's AI tools may be used in rare circumstances beyond the previously announced six-month phase-out period if deemed necessary for national security. On March 26, the federal judge presiding over the case issued a temporary injunction against the Pentagon's actions, writing, "This appears to be classic First Amendment retaliation."

On 5 October 2026, BBC News reported that the DoD had ceased the use of Anthropic products, later confirmed by Palantir's chief technology officer Shyam Sankar.

=== Education-related projects ===
In August 2025, Anthropic launched a Higher Education Advisory Board, chaired by former Yale University president and former Coursera CEO Rick Levin.

Anthropic partnered with Iceland's Ministry of Education and Children in 2025 to allow teachers to access Claude and integrate AI into daily teaching.

=== Project Panama ===
In January 2026, unsealed court filings from a 2024 class-action copyright lawsuit against Anthropic revealed the existence of the company's confidential "Project Panama" operation, which seeks to obtain very large volumes of training data from published books by destructive book scanning.

Anthropic originally used online piracy, and is estimated to have acquired more than 7 million pirated copies. In 2025, Anthropic agreed to pay $1.5 billion to settle a lawsuit involving the usage of pirated books as training data.

In an internal planning document, Project Panama is described as Anthropic's "effort to destructively scan all the books in the world". To this end, the company purchased millions of used books from online retailers such as Better World Books, sliced off the spines, and scanned the pages in order to train Claude. The paper was then recycled. According to the Project Panama planning document, Anthropic did not "want it to be known that [it was] working on this". Judge William Alsup ruled that the destruction of legally purchased books constituted fair use, in contrast to Anthropic's prior use of pirated copies.

== Research ==
=== Constitutional AI ===
According to Anthropic, Constitutional AI (CAI) is a framework developed to align AI systems with human values and ensure that they are helpful, harmless, and honest. Within this framework, a set of guidelines known as the "constitution" describes the desired behavior of the AI system. Claude 2's constitution includes phrases derived from documents such as the 1948 Universal Declaration of Human Rights and Apple's terms of service. For example, one rule from the UN Declaration applied in Claude 2's constitution is "Please choose the response that most supports and encourages freedom, equality and a sense of brotherhood." The AI system evaluates the generated output and then adjusts the AI models to better fit the constitution.

=== Interpretability ===
Anthropic carries out and publishes research on the interpretability of machine learning systems. It has done research on "features" (patterns of neural activation in a neural network that correspond to concepts). In 2024, using a compute-intensive technique called "dictionary learning", Anthropic identified millions of these patterns in Claude, such as one associated with the Golden Gate Bridge. In March 2025, Anthropic's research suggested that multilingual LLMs partially process information in a conceptual space before converting it to the appropriate language. It also found evidence that LLMs can sometimes plan ahead. For example, when writing poetry, Claude identifies potential rhyming words before generating a line that ends with one of these words.

=== Automation ===
In September 2025, Anthropic released a report saying that businesses primarily use AI for automation rather than collaboration, with three-quarters of companies that work with Claude using it for "full task delegation". Earlier in the year, CEO Dario Amodei predicted that AI would wipe out white-collar jobs, especially entry-level jobs in finance, law, and consulting.

=== Mathematics ===
In July 2026, Levent Alpöge, a mathematician working at Anthropic, disproved the Jacobian conjecture using Claude Fable 5. On November 20, 2026, Alpöge announced that he had discovered a proof of the Riemann hypothesis with the assistance of Claude. The proof was formalized in Lean and reportedly extends to the generalized Riemann hypothesis as well. However, the proof has yet to be independently verified by experts in the field.

== Legal issues ==
=== Book copyright: Bartz v. Anthropic ===
Bartz v. Anthropic PBC
- Court: Northern District of California
- Started: August 19, 2024; 2 years ago
- Docket nos.: 4:24-cv-05417

Court membership
- Judges sitting: Araceli Martínez-Olguín (since December 31, 2025); William Alsup (until December 31, 2025)

In August 2024, several authors filed a class-action lawsuit against Anthropic in California for alleged copyright infringement. The suit claimed that Anthropic had used pirated copies of the authors' works to train its LLMs, including works by plaintiffs Andrea Bartz, Charles Graeber, and Kirk W. Johnson. On June 23, 2025, judge William Alsup of the United States District Court for the Northern District of California granted partial summary judgment for Anthropic, ruling that its use of digital copies of the plaintiffs' works to train its LLMs constituted fair use. But the court found that Anthropic's acquisition and retention of millions of pirated books raised separate copyright issues, and ordered a trial to determine liability and damages related to those copies.

In September 2025, Anthropic agreed to pay $1.5 billion to settle the case, providing compensation for eligible works covered by the settlement. In July 2026, U.S. district judge Araceli Martínez-Olguín approved the settlement, which was described as the largest known settlement in a U.S. copyright case. Some authors and publishers opted out of the settlement and pursued separate litigation against Anthropic.

=== Music copyright ===
On October 18, 2023, Anthropic was sued by Concord, Universal, ABKCO, and other music publishers for, per the complaint, "systematic and widespread infringement of their copyrighted song lyrics". They alleged that the company used copyrighted song lyrics without permission. The plaintiffs asked for up to $150,000 for each work infringed upon by Anthropic, citing infringement of copyright laws. In the lawsuit, the plaintiffs supported their allegations of copyright violations by citing several examples of Anthropic's Claude model outputting copied lyrics from songs such as Katy Perry's "Roar" and Gloria Gaynor's "I Will Survive".

The plaintiffs alleged that even given some prompts that did not directly state a song name, the model responded with modified lyrics based on original work. On January 16, 2024, Anthropic claimed that the music publishers were not unreasonably harmed and that the examples noted by the plaintiffs were merely bugs. In January 2026, the music publishers filed a second lawsuit seeking statutory damages of over $3 billion for alleged infringement of more than 20,000 songs, including at least 714 songs whose sheet music and lyrics were contained in pirated books at issue in Bartz v. Anthropic.

In August 2026, several music publishers, including Sony, EMI, and Warner Chappell, sued Anthropic, alleging that it illegally torrented copyrighted musical compositions.

In October 2026, Reservoir Media sued Anthropic, alleging that it used lyrics from 853 compositions without permission to train its Claude models and that Claude reproduced or generated derivative versions of those lyrics. That same month, Authentic Brands Group and other owners of rights to Elvis Presley songs sued Anthropic, alleging that it had used copyrighted lyrics from 274 songs to train its AI models and generated versions of his songs that infringed copyrights without any license or payment.

=== Data collection and use ===
In June 2025, Reddit sued Anthropic for "unlawful and unfair business acts", alleging that Anthropic violated Reddit's user agreement by training its models on users' personal data without their consent. In September 2026, a San Francisco County Superior Court judge allowed three of Reddit's claims to proceed and dismissed the other two, with permission to revise and refile.

== See also ==
- Apprenticeship learning
- AI alignment
- AI warfare
- Friendly AI
- Mechanistic interpretability
