= Artificial intelligence industry in China =

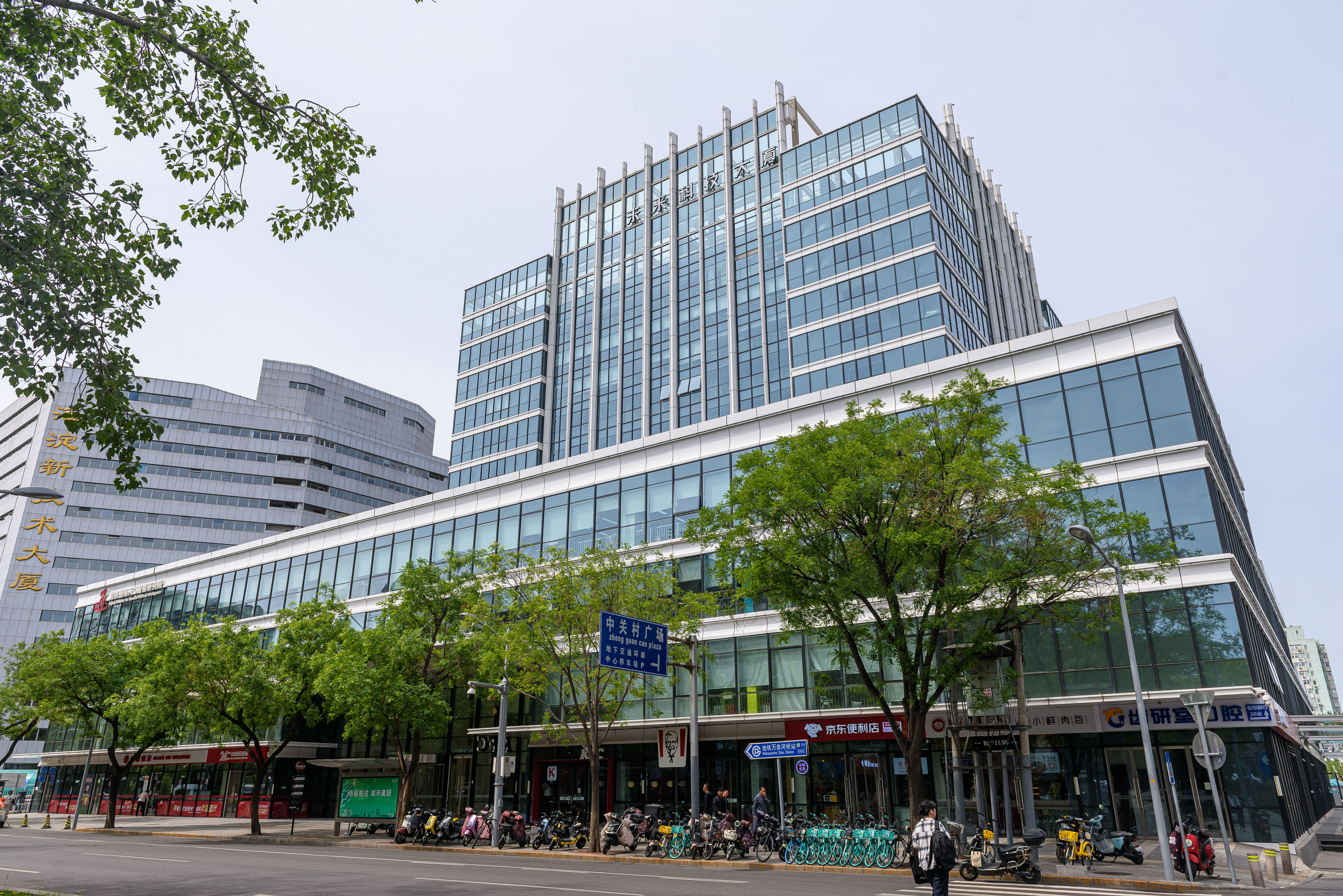
The Beijing Institute for General Artificial Intelligence established in 2020

Since 2006, the Chinese government has steadily developed a national agenda for artificial intelligence (AI) development and emerged as one of the leading nations in AI research and development. In 2016, the Chinese Communist Party (CCP) released its 13th Five-Year Plan in which it aimed to become a global AI leader by 2030. Since the AI boom of the 2020s, China is a world leader in AI technology alongside the United States.

The State Council has a list of "national AI teams" including fifteen China-based companies, including Baidu, Tencent, Alibaba, SenseTime, and iFlytek. Each company should lead the development of a designated specialized AI sector in China, such as facial recognition, software/hardware, and speech recognition. China's rapid AI development has significantly impacted Chinese society in many areas, including the socio-economic, military, intelligence, and political spheres. The private sector, university laboratories, and the military are working collaboratively in many aspects as there are few current existing boundaries.

In 2021, China published the Data Security Law of the People's Republic of China, its first national law addressing AI-related ethical concerns. In October 2022, the United States federal government announced a series of export controls and trade restrictions intended to restrict China's access to advanced computer chips for AI applications. In 2023, the Cyberspace Administration of China issued guidelines requiring that AI content uphold the ideology of the CCP including Core Socialist Values, avoids discrimination, respects intellectual property rights, and safeguards user data. In 2025, the Chinese government issued a document regarding training data, requiring companies to use as little data deemed "unsafe" as possible, as well as requiring companies to test models regularly.

Concerns have been raised about the effects of the Chinese government's censorship regime on the development of generative artificial intelligence and long-term talent acquisition with the state of the country's demographics. Artificial intelligence models trained on Chinese data express views that are close to those of the CCP and the Chinese government. Others have noted that official notions of AI safety require following the priorities of the CCP and are antithetical to standards in democratic societies and raised concerns about the extension of China's system of mass surveillance and censorship abroad. China's artificial intelligence industry has been noted for being driven significantly by cheaper open-source models, allowing for significant global adoption of Chinese models.

In the 2026 Global Index on Responsible AI, China scored 43.58 which ranked the country 42nd of 135 countries and ahead of 69% of those assessed, 10.6 points above the Asia and Oceania average (33.0) and 11.7 points above the upper-middle-income average (31.9).

== History ==
The Chinese term for artificial intelligence (réngōngzhìnéng 人工智能) connotes "humanmade" intelligence. The term developed as mid-20th century localisation of the Japanese term jinko chino.

The research and development of artificial intelligence in China started in the 1980s, with the announcement by Deng Xiaoping of the importance of science and technology for China's economic growth.

=== Late 1970s to early 2010s ===
Chinese artificial intelligence research and development began in the late 1970s after Deng Xiaoping's reform and opening up. China's first national conference on AI occurred in 1979. Academic journals in the late 1970s began publishing literature reviews of Western research on AI topics.

In the 1980s, a group of Chinese scientists launched AI research led by Qian Xuesen and Wu Wenjun. However, during the time, China's society still had a generally conservative view towards AI. In the early 1980s, Science Press published translated versions of Western textbooks such as Patrick Winston's Artificial Intelligence and Nils John Nilsson's Principles of Artificial Intelligence. In 1980, a journal of the Chinese Academy of Sciences convened its first annual National Symposium on Artificial Intelligence, which included national and international scholars like Herbert A. Simon.

The Chinese Association for Artificial Intelligence (CAAI) was founded in September 1981 and was authorized by the Ministry of Civil Affairs. CAAI has continued to be the largest AI association in China as of 2025. In 1982, CAAI began publishing the Artificial Intelligence Journal, which published early AI research by Chinese academics.

In the 1980s, Chinese research on AI was influenced by the field of cybernetics, particularly the work of Norbert Weiner and his text Cybernetics: Or Control and Communication in the Animal and the Machine. Chinese researchers at the time sought to situate AI as part of a broader "Intelligence Science" field which would include disciplines like mathematics, computer science, cognitive science, social sciences, and philosophy.

In 1987, Tsinghua University began a research publication on AI.

Beginning in 1993, smart automation and intelligence have been part of China's national technology plan.

Since the 2000s, the Chinese government has further expanded its research and development funds for AI and the number of government-sponsored research projects has dramatically increased. In 2006, China announced a policy priority for the development of artificial intelligence, which was included in the National Medium and Long Term Plan for the Development of Science and Technology (2006–2020), released by the State Council. In the same year, artificial intelligence was also mentioned in the 11th Five-Year Plan.

In 2011, the Association for the Advancement of Artificial Intelligence (AAAI) established a branch in Beijing, China. At same year, the Wu Wenjun Artificial Intelligence Science and Technology Award was founded in honor of Chinese mathematician Wu Wenjun, and it became the highest award for Chinese achievements in the field of artificial intelligence. The first award ceremony was held on May 14, 2012. In 2013, the International Joint Conferences on Artificial Intelligence (IJCAI) was held in Beijing, marking the first time the conference was held in China. This event coincided with the Chinese government's announcement of the "Chinese Intelligence Year," a significant milestone in China's development of artificial intelligence.

=== Late 2010s to early 2020s ===
AI became a major issue of commercial, public, and political focus in China in the latter half of the 2010s. Various interpretations of the primary cause for this increased focus exist, with some analyses focusing on the 2016 Go match between Google's AlphaGo and Lee Sedol, others emphasising the U.S. increasing trade restrictions on China's technology industries and the desire to achieve national technological self-sufficiency.

The State Council of China issued "A Next Generation Artificial Intelligence Development Plan" (State Council Document [2017] No. 35) on 20 July 2017. In the document, the CCP Central Committee and the State Council urged governing bodies in China to promote the development of artificial intelligence. Specifically, the plan described AI as a strategic technology that has become a "focus of international competition".^{:2} The document urged significant investment in a number of strategic areas related to AI and called for close cooperation between the state and private sectors. It set the goal of China becoming the preeminent country for AI research and application by 2030.

During the general secretaryship of Xi Jinping, artificial intelligence has been a focus of the CCP's military-civil fusion efforts. On the occasion of Xi's speech at the first plenary meeting of the Central Military-Civil Fusion Development Committee (CMCFDC), scholars from the National Defense University wrote in the PLA Daily that the "transferability of social resources" between economic and military ends is an essential component to being a great power. During the Two Sessions 2017,"artificial intelligence plus" was proposed to be elevated to a strategic level. The same year witnessed the emergence of multiple application-level usages in the medical field according to reports.

In 2018, Xinhua News Agency, in partnership with Tencent's subsidiary Sogou, launched its first artificial intelligence-generated news anchor.

In 2018, the State Council budgeted $2.1 billion for an AI industrial park in Mentougou district. In order to achieve this the State Council stated the need for massive talent acquisition, theoretical and practical developments, as well as public and private investments. Some of the stated motivations that the State Council gave for pursuing its AI strategy include the potential of artificial intelligence for industrial transformation, better social governance and maintaining social stability. As of the end of 2020, Shanghai's Pudong District had 600 AI companies across foundational, technical, and application layers, with related industries valued at around 91 billion yuan.

In 2019, the application of artificial intelligence expanded to various fields such as quantum physics, geography, and medical research. With the emergence of large language models (LLMs), at the beginning of 2020, Chinese researchers began developing their own LLMs. One such example is the multimodal large model called 'Zidongtaichu.'

The Beijing Academy of Artificial Intelligence launched China's first large scale pre-trained language model in 2022.

In March 2022, regulators in China instituted requirements for companies to disclose AI algorithms to the Cyberspace Administration of China (CAC) for supervision.

In November 2022, the Cyberspace Administration of China (CAC), Ministry of Industry and Information Technology, and the Ministry of Public Security jointly issued the regulations concerning deepfakes, which became effective in January 2023.

In July 2023, Huawei released its version 3.0 of its Pangu LLM.

In July 2023, China released its Interim Measures for the Administration of Generative Artificial Intelligence Services. A draft proposal on basic generative AI services safety requirements, including specifications for data collection and model training was issued in October 2023.

Also in October 2023, the Chinese government launched its Global AI Governance Initiative, which frames its AI policy as part of a Community of Common Destiny and aims to build AI policy dialogue with developing countries. The Initiative has expressed concern over AI safety risks, including abuse of data or the use of AI by terrorists.

In 2024, Spamouflage, an online disinformation and propaganda campaign of the Ministry of Public Security, began using news anchors created with generative artificial intelligence to deliver fake news clips.

In March 2024, Premier Li Qiang launched the AI+ Initiative, which intends to integrate AI into China's real economy.

In May 2024, the Cyberspace Administration of China announced that it rolled out a large language model trained on Xi Jinping Thought.

According to the 2024 report from the International Data Corporation (IDC), Baidu AI Cloud holds China's largest LLM market share with 19.9 percent and US$49 million in revenue over the last year. This was followed by SenseTime, with 16 percent market share, and by Zhipu AI, as the third largest. The fourth and fifth largest were Baichuan and the Hong-Kong listed AI company 4Paradigm respectively. Baichuan, Zhipu AI, Moonshot AI and MiniMax were praised by investors as China's new "AI Tigers". In April 2024, 117 generative AI models had been approved by the Chinese government.

As of 2024, many Chinese technology firms such as Zhipu AI and Bytedance have launched AI video-generation tools to rival OpenAI's Sora.

In March 2026, the Chinese government moved to restrict state agencies and state-owned enterprises from using OpenClaw, citing security concerns. In April 2026, in what was described as an instance of Track II diplomacy, members of a Chinese think tank channeled a request for access to Claude Mythos through the Carnegie Endowment for International Peace at an event in Singapore. Anthropic refused and the exchange alarmed the United States National Security Council. In May 2026, the head of Germany's Federal Office for Information Security stated that previously open Chinese AI models had moved development to a closed-source model, which was believed to be a response to Claude Mythos.

In July 2026, Xi Jinping announced the creation of the World Artificial Intelligence Cooperation Organization (WAICO) at the World Artificial Intelligence Conference in Shanghai.

=== Chronology of major AI-related policies ===
| Year | Policy document | Issued by |
|---|---|---|
| 2015 | Made in China 2025 | State Council of China |
| 2015 | "Guiding Opinions of the State Council on Actively Promoting the "Internet Plus" Action" 国务院关于积极推进"互联网+"行动的指导意见 | State Council of China |
| 2016 | 13th Five-Year Plan of China 中华人民共和国国民经济和社会发展第十三个五年规划纲要 | State Council of China |
| 2016 | "Internet +' AI Three-Year Implementation Plan" 新一代AI产业发展三年行动计划 | National Development and Reform Commission; Ministry of Science and Technology; Ministry of Industry and Information Technology; Central Leading Group for Cyberspace Affairs |
| 2017 | "New Generation AI Development Plan" 新一代人工智能发展规划 | State Council of China |
| 2019 | Guidelines for the Construction of the National New Generation Artificial Intelligence Open Innovation Platform" 国家新一代人工智能开放创新平台建设工作指引 | Ministry of Science and Technology |
| 2020 | "National New Generation of AI Standardization Guidance" 国家新一代人工智能标准体系建设指南 | National Standardization Administration; Central Cyberspace Administration; National Development and Reform Commission; Ministry of Science and Technology; Ministry of Industry and Information Technology |
| 2021 | 14th Five-Year Plan of China 中华人民共和国国民经济和社会发展第十四个五年规划纲要 | State Council of China |
| 2021 | "A new generation of artificial intelligence ethics code" 新一代人工智能伦理规范 | Ministry of Science and Technology |
| 2021 | China's Data Security Law 中华人民共和国数据安全法 | State Council of China |
| 2023 | Interim Measures for Generative AI Services 生成式人工智能服务管理暂行办法 | Cyberspace Administration of China; National Development and Reform Commission; Ministry of Education; Ministry of Science and Technology; Ministry of Industry and Information Technology; Ministry of Public Security; National Radio and Television Administration |
| 2025 | Basic Security Requirements for Generative Artificial Intelligence Service 网络安全技术生成式人工智能服务安全基本要求 | State Administration for Market Regulation |

== Government goals ==
According to a February 2019 publication by Gregory C. Allen of the Center for a New American Security, CCP general secretary Xi Jinping – believes that being at the forefront of AI technology will be critical to the future of global military and economic power competition. By 2025, the State Council aims for China to make fundamental contributions to basic AI theory and to solidify its place as a global leader in AI research. Further, the State Council aims for AI to become "the main driving force for China's industrial upgrading and economic transformation" by this time. By 2030, the State Council aims to have China be the global leader in the development of artificial intelligence theory and technology. The State Council claims that China will have developed a "mature new-generation AI theory and technology system."

According to academics Karen M. Sutter and Zachary Arnold, the Chinese government "seeks to meld state planning and control while some operational flexibility for firms. In this context, China's AI firms are hybrid players. The state guides their activity, funds, and shields them from foreign competition through domestic market protections, creating asymmetric advantages as they expand offshore."

China's 14th Five-Year Plan reaffirmed AI as a top research priority and ranks AI first among "frontier industries" that the Chinese government aims to focus on through 2035. The AI industry is a strategic sector often supported by China's government guidance funds. Due to security concerns around strategically sensitive economic sectors, the government dissuades executives at Chinese AI companies from traveling to the U.S. and, if required to travel, to brief authorities before and after travel.

=== Research and development ===
Chinese public AI funding mainly focused on advanced and applied research. The government funding also supported multiple AI R&D in the private sector through venture capitals that are backed by the state. Much analytic agency research showed that, while China is massively investing in all aspects of AI development, facial recognition, biotechnology, quantum computing, medical intelligence, and autonomous vehicles are AI sectors with the most attention and funding.

According to national guidance on developing China's high-tech industrial development zones by the Ministry of Science and Technology, there are fourteen cities and one county selected as an experimental development zone. Zhejiang and Guangdong provinces have the most AI innovation in experimental areas. However, the focus of AI R&D varied depending on cities and local industrial development and ecosystems. For instance, Suzhou, a city with a longstanding strong manufacturing industry, heavily focuses on automation and AI infrastructure while Wuhan focuses more on AI implementations and the education sector. In connection with universities, tech firms, and national ministries, Shenzhen and Hangzhou each co-founded generative AI labs. In 2016 and 2017, Chinese teams won the top prize at the Large Scale Visual Recognition Challenge, an international competition for computer vision systems. Many of these systems are now being integrated into China's domestic surveillance network.

Interdisciplinary collaborations play an essential role in China's AI R&D, including academic-corporate collaboration, public-private collaborations, and international collaborations and projects with corporate-government partnerships are the most common. China ranked in the top three worldwide following the United States and the European Union for the total number of peer-reviewed AI publications that were produced under a corporate-academic partnership between 2015 and 2019. Besides, according to an AI index report, China surpassed the U.S. in 2020 in the total number of global AI-related journal citations. In terms of AI-related R&D, China-based peer-reviewed AI papers are mainly sponsored by the government. In May 2021, China's Beijing Academy of Artificial Intelligence released the world's largest pre-trained language model (WuDao).

As of 2023, 47% of the world's top AI researchers had completed their undergraduate studies in China. According to a 2024 World Intellectual Property Organization (WIPO) analysis, China has published more patents in generative AI annually than all other countries since 2017. According to academic Angela Huyue Zhang, publishing in 2024, while the Chinese government has been proactive in regulating AI services and imposing obligations on AI companies, the overall approach to its regulation is loose and demonstrates a pro-growth policy favorable to China's AI industry. In July 2024, the government opened its first algorithm registration center in Beijing.

In 2025, The Washington Post reported that China has surpassed the United States in the release of publicly available "open" artificial intelligence models. In the same year, the Chinese Academy of Sciences introduced ScienceOne, an artificial intelligence platform for scientific research.

In March 2026, the Chinese government launched that a Tibetan-language AI app called "DeepZang," which reflects state positions on religion and governance in Tibet. In April 2026, Chinese regulators blocked Meta Platforms’ $2 billion acquisition of AI startup Manus, citing national security and export control concerns. Although Manus was registered in Singapore, its core technology originated in China. The move reflects China's tighter oversight of AI and strategic technologies, particularly regarding foreign involvement.

==== Population ====
China's large population generates a massive amount of accessible data for companies and researchers, which offers a crucial advantage in the race of big data. As of 2024, China has the world's largest number of internet users, generating huge amounts of data for machine learning and AI applications.

==== Facial recognition ====
Facial recognition is one of the most widely employed AI applications in China. Collecting these large amounts of data from its residents helps further train and expand AI capabilities. China's market is not only conducive and valuable for corporations to further AI R&D but also offers tremendous economic potential attracting both international and domestic firms to join the AI market. The drastic development of the information and communication technology (ICT) industry and AI chipsets in recent years are two examples of this. China has become the world's largest exporter of facial recognition technology, according to a January 2023 Wired report.

=== Censorship and content controls ===
Due to the censorship of the Chinese Internet and Chinese state media, AI models trained on Chinese language data generally express views favorable to the Chinese Communist Party and Chinese government when speaking in Chinese.

In April 2023, the Cyberspace Administration of China (CAC) issued draft measures stating that tech companies will be obligated to ensure AI-generated content upholds the ideology of the CCP including Core Socialist Values, avoids discrimination, respects intellectual property rights, and safeguards user data. Under these draft measures, companies bear legal responsibility for training data and content generated through their platforms. In October 2023, the Chinese government mandated that AI-generated content may not "incite subversion of state power or the overthrowing of the socialist system". Before releasing a large language model to the public, companies must seek approval from the CAC to certify that the model refuses to answer certain questions relating to political ideology and criticism of the CCP. Prompts related to politically sensitive topics such as the 1989 Tiananmen Square protests and massacre or comparisons between Xi Jinping and Winnie the Pooh must be declined.

In 2023, in-country access was blocked to Hugging Face, a company that maintains libraries containing training data sets commonly used for large language models. A subsidiary of the People's Daily, the official newspaper of the Central Committee of the Chinese Communist Party, provides local companies with training data that CCP leaders consider permissible. In 2024, the People's Daily released an LLM-based tool called Easy Write. Microsoft has warned that the Chinese government uses generative artificial intelligence to interfere in foreign elections by spreading disinformation and provoking discussions on divisive political issues. The Chinese artificial intelligence model DeepSeek has been reported to refuse to answer questions relating to things about the 1989 Tiananmen Square protests and massacre, persecution of Uyghurs, comparisons between Xi Jinping and Winnie the Pooh or human rights in China. According to research outside China, AI regulations have had the effect of Chinese AI models performing better on AI safety and suicide prevention metrics such as producing content with less violence and pornography, as well as less information that leads users toward self-harm. However, they also had less constraints against "jailbreaking". Tests of Alibaba's Qwen models have been found to employ a technique called "thought token forcing" to keep answers positive toward the Chinese government and in line with its "public opinion guidance" directives.

In November 2025, the Chinese government finalized a set of rules regarding training data. It states that human testers from companies should randomly evaluate 4,000 pieces of training data for each format of content their AI can handle, including text, video and images, and not use a given source unless at least 96% of the material is deemed safe. The document defines unsafe in 31 categories, including data that includes "incitement to subvert state power and overthrow the socialist system", as well as sources that promote violence, false information or discrimination, and content that uses someone's likeness without permission. Prompts designed to trigger responses leading to subversion of state power or discrimination must be declined at a rate of 95%. The regulations state that chatbots should be tested with 2,000 questions and regular updates of the questions at least once a month. Regulations also require chatbots to implement a Internet real-name system, requiring users to register with a phone number or national ID.

In May 2026, China restricted international travel for key AI professionals at companies like DeepSeek and Alibaba, requiring some to get official approval before leaving the country. The move aimed to keep top talent in China and protect its AI technology amid growing competition with the US.

== Leading companies ==
Leading AI-centric companies and start-ups include Baidu, Tencent, Alibaba, SenseTime, 4Paradigm and Yitu Technology. Chinese AI companies iFlytek, SenseTime, Cloudwalk and DJI have received attention for facial recognition, sound recognition and drone technologies. Chinese AI companies' success at raising funds from domestic and foreign investors has resulted in a substantial number of unicorns (privately held companies valued over US$1 billion).

China's government takes a market-oriented approach to AI, and has sought to encourage private tech companies in developing AI. In 2018, it designated Baidu, Alibaba, iFlytek, Tencent, and SenseTime as "AI champions". It was the Ministry of Science and Technology specifically, that established a national AI team. All of the companies listed were found on the MIT Technology Review's list of the smartest companies in the world in 2017 with major players being Baidu, Alibaba, and Tencent. The first AI national team was named to advance next-generation AI tools and systems. The initiative supports China's strategy for Global AI leadership, with specific businesses named, looking to leverage their strengths to accelerate AI technologies like voice assistants and cars that drive themselves. Different companies were tasked with different activities, like Baidu's Apollo platform, which heads self-driving vehicles, is working on mapping sensors and AI algorithms to create commercial systems in China. Alibaba's cloud computing division was tasked with developing city brains to optimize traffic flows. These AI solutions focus on broad urban AI applications. Tencent was given medical vision tasks while iFlytek focused on voice intelligence.

In 2023, Tencent debuted its large language model Hunyuan for enterprise use on Tencent Cloud. New leading AI startups include Baichuan, Zhipu AI, Moonshot AI and MiniMax which were praised by investors as China's new "AI Tigers" in 2024. 01.AI has also been touted as a leading startup. In January 2025, DeepSeek launched its model DeepSeek-R1 and surprised the Western world. Its performance with minimal hardware is comparable to the leading models in the US. DeepSeek is a subsidiary of High-Flyer, a privately owned company in Hangzhou, Zhejiang.

| Year | Company | Designated AI Specialty |
|---|---|---|
| 2017 | Alibaba Cloud (阿里云) | Smart City Brain |
| 2017 | Baidu (百度) | Autonomous Vehicle |
| 2017 | Tencent (腾讯) | Medical Intelligence |
| 2017 | iFlytek (科大讯飞) | Voice Recognition |
| 2018 | SenseTime (商汤) | Intelligent Vision |
| 2019 | Yitu (依图科技) | Visual Computing |
| 2019 | Minglamp Technology (明略科技) | Intelligent Marketing |
| 2019 | Huawei (华为) | Software and Hardware |
| 2019 | Pingan (中国平安) | Financial Intelligence |
| 2019 | Hikvision (海康威视) | Video Perception |
| 2019 | JD.com (京东) | Smart Supply Chain |
| 2019 | Megvii (旷世科技) | Visual Perception |
| 2019 | Qihoo 360 (奇虎360) | Security and Smart Brain |
| 2019 | TAL Education Group (好未来) | Education |
| 2019 | Xiaomi (小米) | Home Automation |

== Impact ==
=== Economic impact ===
Some analysts hold optimistic views about AI's economic impact on China's long-term economic growth. In the past, traditional industries in China have struggled with the increase in labor costs due to the growing aging population in China and the low birth rate. With the deployment of AI, operational costs are expected to reduce while an increase in efficiency generates revenue growth. Some highlight the importance of a clear policy and governmental support in order to overcome adoption barriers including costs and lack of properly trained technical talents and AI awareness. However, there are concerns about China's deepening income inequality and the ever-expanding imbalanced labor market in China. Low- and medium-income workers might be the most negatively impacted by China's AI development because of rising demands for laborers with advanced skills. Furthermore, China's economic growth might be disproportionately divided as a majority of AI-related industrial development is concentrated in coastal regions rather than inland.

An influential decision by the Beijing Internet Court has ruled that AI-generated content is entitled to copyright protection.

=== Military impact ===
China is investing heavily in artificial intelligence for military and intelligence purposes. China seeks to build a "world-class" military by "intelligentization" with a particular focus on the use of unmanned weapons and artificial intelligence. It is researching various types of air, land, sea, and undersea autonomous vehicles. In the spring of 2017, a civilian Chinese university with ties to the military demonstrated an AI-enabled swarm of 1,000 uninhabited aerial vehicles at an airshow. A media report released afterwards showed a computer simulation of a similar swarm formation finding and destroying a missile launcher.^{:23} Open-source publications indicated that China is also developing a suite of AI tools for cyber operations.^{:27} Chinese development of military AI is largely influenced by China's observation of U.S. plans for defense innovation and fears of a widening "generational gap" in comparison to the U.S. military. Similar to U.S. military concepts, China aims to use AI for exploiting large troves of intelligence, generating a common operating picture, and accelerating battlefield decision-making.^{:12-14} The Chinese Multi-Domain Precision Warfare (MDPW) is considered China's response to the U.S. Joint All-Domain Command and Control (JADC2) strategy, which seeks to integrate sensors and weapons with AI and a vigorous network.

Twelve categories of military applications of AI have been identified: UAVs, USVs, UUVs, UGVs, intelligent munitions, intelligent satellites, ISR (Intelligence, Surveillance and Reconnaissance) software, automated cyber defense software, automated cyberattack software, decision support, software, automated missile launch software, and cognitive electronic warfare software.

China's management of its AI ecosystem contrasts with that of the United States.^{:6} In general, few boundaries exist between Chinese commercial companies, university research laboratories, the military, and the central government. As a result, the Chinese government has a direct means of guiding AI development priorities and accessing technology that was ostensibly developed for civilian purposes. To further strengthen these ties the Chinese government created a Military-Civil Fusion Development Commission which is intended to speed the transfer of AI technology from commercial companies and research institutions to the military in January 2017.^{:19} In addition, the Chinese government is leveraging both lower barriers to data collection and lower costs of data labeling to create the large databases on which AI systems train. According to one estimate, China is on track to possess 20% of the world's share of data by 2020, with the potential to have over 30% by 2030.^{:12}

China's centrally directed effort is investing in the U.S. AI market, in companies working on militarily relevant AI applications, potentially granting it lawful access to U.S. technology and intellectual property. Chinese venture capital investment in U.S. AI companies between 2010 and 2017 totaled an estimated $1.3 billion. In September 2022, the U.S. Biden administration issued an executive order to prevent foreign investments, "particularly those from competitor or adversarial nations," from investing in U.S. technology firms, due to U.S. national security concerns. The order covers fields of U.S. technologies in which Chinese government has been investing, including "microelectronics, artificial intelligence, biotechnology and biomanufacturing, quantum computing, [and] advanced clean energy."

In 2024, researchers from the People's Liberation Army Academy of Military Sciences were reported to have developed a military tool using Llama, which Meta Platforms said was unauthorized due to its model's use prohibition for military purposes. In March 2025, the U.S. Commerce Department added the Beijing Academy of Artificial Intelligence and Beijing Innovation Wisdom Technology Co. to the Entity List for allegedly developing technology for military purposes.

Some analysts have noted that some military applications of artificial intelligence could pose challenges to and may eventually degrade the CCP's absolute control of the military.

=== Academia ===
Although in 2004, Peking University introduced the first academic course on AI which led other Chinese universities to adopt AI as a discipline, especially since China faces challenges in recruiting and retaining AI engineers and researchers. Over half of the data scientists in the United States have been working in the field for over 10 years, while roughly the same proportion of data scientists in China have less than 5 years of experience. As of 2017, fewer than 30 Chinese Universities produce AI-focused experts and research products.^{:8} Although China surpassed the United States in the number of research papers produced from 2011 to 2015, the quality of its published papers, as judged by peer citations, ranked 34th globally. China especially wants to address military applications and so the Beijing Institute of Technology, one of China's premier institutes for weapons research, recently established the first children's educational program in military AI in the world.

In 2019, 34% of Chinese students studying in the AI field stayed in China for work. According to a database maintained by an American think tank, that percentage increased to 58% in 2022.

=== Ethical concerns ===
For the past years, there are discussions about AI safety and ethical concerns in both private and public sectors. In 2021, China's Ministry of Science and Technology published the first national ethical guideline, the New Generation of Artificial Intelligence Ethics Code on the topic of AI with a specific emphasis on user protection, data privacy, and security. This document acknowledges the power of AI and quick technology adaptation by big corporations for user engagement. The South China Morning Post reported that humans shall remain in full decision-making power and rights to opt-in/-out. Before this, the Beijing Academy of Artificial Intelligence published the Beijing AI principles calling for essential needs in long-term research and planning of AI ethical principles.

Data security has been the most common topic in AI ethical discussion worldwide, and many national governments have established legislation addressing data privacy and security. The Cybersecurity Law of the People's Republic of China was enacted in 2017 aiming to address new challenges raised by AI development. In 2021, China's new Data Security Law (DSL) was passed by the PRC congress, setting up a regulatory framework classifying all kinds of data collection and storage in China. This means all tech companies in China are required to classify their data into categories listed in Digital Subscriber Line (DSL) and follow specific guidelines on how to govern and handle data transfers to other parties.

Some observers have noted that notions of AI safety in the PRC entail following the priorities of the CCP and is antithetical to standards in democratic societies.

In February 2026, Anthropic reported that three Chinese AI companies, DeepSeek, Moonshot AI, and MiniMax, conducted large-scale "distillation attacks" on its Claude model through fraudulent accounts. Anthropic said the attacks sought to extract Claude's capabilities and posed security risks. In June 2026, Anthropic accused Alibaba of similar large-scale distillation attacks.

In September 2026, the Federal Bureau of Investigation (FBI), National Security Agency (NSA), and Cybersecurity and Infrastructure Security Agency issued an advisory alleging that six Chinese artificial intelligence companies: DeepSeek, Moonshot AI, Alibaba, MiniMax, StepFun, and Z.ai had systematically used distillation attacks to extract capabilities from American AI models since 2024. The advisory identified models from Anthropic, OpenAI, Google, and xAI as among those allegedly targeted and said the activity had likely occurred with Chinese government awareness. The Chinese government rejected the allegations.

=== Judicial system ===
In 2019, the city of Hangzhou established a pilot program artificial intelligence-based Internet Court to adjudicate disputes related to ecommerce and internet-related intellectual property claims. Parties appear before the court via videoconference and AI evaluates the evidence presented and applies relevant legal standards.

Because some controversial cases that drew public criticism for their low punishments have been withdrawn from China Judgments Online, there are concerns about whether AI based on fragmented judicial data can reach unbiased decisions. Zhang Linghan, professor of law at the China University of Political Science and Law, writes that AI-technology companies may erode judicial power. Some scholars argue that “increasing party leadership, political oversight, and reducing the discretionary space of judges are intentional goals of SCR [smart court reform]."

== Assessment ==
Academic Jinghan Zeng argued the Chinese government's commitment to global AI leadership and technological competition was driven by its previous underperformance in innovation which was seen by the CCP as a part of the century of humiliation. According to Zeng, there are historically embedded causes of China's anxiety towards securing an international technological dominance – China missed both industrial revolutions, the one starting in Britain in the mid-18th century, and the one that originated in America in the late-19th century. Therefore, China's government desires to take advantage of the technological revolution in today's world led by digital technology including AI to resume China's "rightful" place and to pursue the national rejuvenation proposed by Xi Jinping.

An article published by the Center for a New American Security concluded that "Chinese government officials demonstrated remarkably keen understanding of the issues surrounding AI and international security. This includes knowledge of the U.S. AI policy discussions," and recommended that "the U.S. policymaking community to similarly prioritize cultivating expertise and understanding of AI developments in China" and "funding, focus, and a willingness among U.S. policymakers to drive large-scale necessary change." An article in the MIT Technology Review similarly concluded: "China might have unparalleled resources and enormous untapped potential, but the West has world-leading expertise and a strong research culture. Rather than worry about China's progress, it would be wise for Western nations to focus on their existing strengths, investing heavily in research and education."

In a 2021 text, the Research Centre for a Holistic Approach to National Security at the China Institutes of Contemporary International Relations wrote that the development of AI creates challenges for holistic national security, including the risks that AI will heighten social tensions or have destabilizing effects on international relations.

Writing from a Chinese Marxist view, academics including Gao Qiqi and Pan Enrong contend that capitalist application of AI will lead to greater oppression of workers and more serious social problems. Gao cites how the development of AI has increased the power of platform companies like Meta, Twitter, and Alphabet, leading to greater capital accumulation and political power in fewer economic actors. According to Gao, the state should be the primary responsible actor in the area of generative AI (creating new content like music or video). Gao writes that military use of AI risks escalating military competition between countries and that the impact of AI in military matters will not be limited to one country but will have spillover effects.

Dialogues between Chinese and Western AI experts about the existential risk from artificial intelligence have taken place.

=== Public polling ===
The Chinese public is generally optimistic regarding AI. A 2021 study conducted across 28 countries found that 78% of the Chinese public believes the benefits of AI outweigh the risks, the highest of any country in the study. In 2024, a survey of elite Chinese university students found that 80% agreed or strongly agreed that AI would do more good than harm for society, and 31% believed it should be regulated by the government. According to a 2026 survey by the University College London, less than 10% of Chinese respondents worried AI would make it harder to find a job, while more than one-third believed AI would create more high-skilled work. The survey also found that 96% of surveyed Chinese respondents used AI at work while 79% thought university students should be taught to use AI "effectively".

=== Human rights ===
The widely used AI facial recognition has raised concerns. According to The New York Times, deployment of AI facial recognition technology in the Xinjiang region to detect Uyghurs is "the first known example of a government intentionally using artificial intelligence for racial profiling,” which is said to be “one of the most striking examples of digital authoritarianism." Researchers have found that in China, areas experiencing higher rates of unrest are associated with increased state acquisition of AI facial recognition technology, especially by local municipal police departments. Concerns have been raised about the use of China's AI in mass surveillance and censorship abroad.

Publishing in 2025, academic Bingchun Meng critiques popular media narratives about Chinese AI, writing that such stories tend towards a "techno-orientalism that either portrays the country as a stealthy imitator of Western technologies or projects a doomsday scenario of an AI-enabled omnipotent surveillance state".

In a December 2025 report, the Australian Strategic Policy Institute stated that the rise of artificial intelligence was transforming China's state control system into a more precise tool for managing the population and targeting groups at home and abroad, raising additional human rights concerns.

== See also ==
- Artificial intelligence arms race – Type of international competition
- China Brain Project – Chinese neuroscience program
- List of artificial intelligence companies
- Regulation of artificial intelligence
- World Artificial Intelligence Conference – Annual international AI conference in Shanghai, China
