= 01.AI =

Chinese artificial intelligence company

Beijing Lingyi Wanwu Information Technology Co., Ltd.
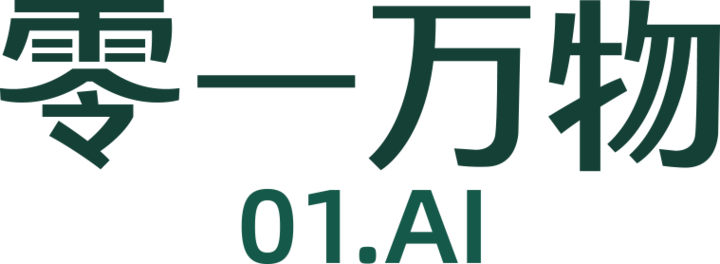
- Trade name: 01.AI
- Native name: 零一万物
- Type: Private
- Industry: Information technology
- Founded: March 2023; 3 years ago
- Founder: Kai-Fu Lee
- Headquarters: Beijing, China
- Key people: Kai-Fu Lee (CEO)
- Products: Yi-34B; Yi-Coder; Yi-Lightning
- Number of employees: 100+ (2023)
- Website: 01.ai

01.AI (Chinese: 零一万物; pinyin: Língyī Wànwù) is an artificial intelligence (AI) company based in Beijing, China. It focuses on developing open source products. It is one of China's 6 "AI Tigers".

== Background ==
01.AI was founded in March 2023 by former Microsoft and Google executive and Sinovation Ventures co-founder Kai-Fu Lee. The Chinese name of 01.AI means "zero-one, everything", alluding to a passage from the Taoist text Tao Te Ching. External backers of 01.AI include Alibaba Group and Xiaomi.

Due to US export controls on semiconductors, 01.AI began amassing the semiconductors earlier in the year and even borrowed money from Sinovation Ventures to fund the purchases. Due to its low supply of chips, 01.AI developed more efficient AI infrastructure and inference engines to train its AI. Its chip-cluster failure rate was lower than industry average.

In June 2023, 01.AI commenced operations. 01.AI opted to build an open source model because the vast majority of AI developers cannot afford or do not require the largest and most expensive models. However, it planned to develop proprietary models for customers in the future.

In November 2023, within eight months of launching 01.AI obtained a valuation over $1 billion giving it unicorn status. The company had a team of over 100 employees.

In October 2024, it was reported that 01.AI was reducing costs by using strategies such as focusing on smaller data sets to train AI models and hiring cheaper engineers. In November 2024, it was reported that 01.AI trained its AI models with just 2,000 GPUs. The cost was $3 million compared to OpenAI's $80–100 million.

In January 2025, Lee denied rumours that 01.AI was negotiating to sell its pre-training team to Alibaba Cloud.

In March 2025, 01.AI stopped "pre-training" large language models to focus on selling tailored AI business solutions using DeepSeek's models.

== Products ==
=== Yi ===
Yi is an open source large language model (LLM).

In November 2023, Yi-34B was launched and made available to developers around the world in Chinese and English. Its name comes from the 34 billion parameters used in training. On key metrics it outperformed other open-source models such as Meta AI's Llama 2. Hugging Face ranked it first for what's known as pre-trained base LLMs.

In September 2024, Yi-Coder was launched. It is a coding assistant that works across 52 programming languages. It is available in 9 billion and 1.5 billion parameter versions. A noted feature is its 128,000 token context length, allowing it to process massive code snippets.

In October 2024, Yi-Lightning was released. In a ranking released by researchers at UC Berkeley SkyLab and LMSYS, it came joint third among LLM companies alongside x.AI's Grok-2, but behind OpenAI and Google. The cost for inference at Yi-Lightning is 14 cents per million tokens, compared with 26 cents for OpenAI's smaller model GPT o1-mini.

=== Wanzhi ===
In May 2024, 01.AI launched Wanzhi, a free productivity assistant that is said to be comparable to Microsoft Copilot. It has versions in Chinese and English.

== See also ==
- Sinovation Ventures – China-based venture capital firm
- Six AI tigers – Chinese AI startup companies
- Baichuan – Chinese artificial intelligence company
- MiniMax (company) – Chinese artificial intelligence company
- Moonshot AI – Chinese artificial intelligence company
- StepFun – Chinese artificial intelligence company
- Zhipu AI – Chinese artificial intelligence company
