= AI tiger =

Chinese AI startup companies

- Chinese: AI六小虎
- Literal meaning: Six AI little tigers
Transcriptions
Standard Mandarin
- Hanyu Pinyin: AI liù xiǎohǔ

AI tiger (Chinese: AI六小虎, romanized: AI liù xiǎohǔ, lit. 'Six AI little tigers') is a term for notable startup companies in the artificial intelligence industry in China. There are commonly six companies defined as AI tigers: Z.ai (GLM), Moonshot AI (Kimi), MiniMax, Baichuan, StepFun, and 01.AI. Funding rounds for the tigers are led by BATX, which are composed of China's four largest tech firms.

== Challenges ==
Aylon Berger of the Lowy Institute argued the AI tigers are far more constrained by financial capital relative to frontier US laboratories. Z.ai and Minimax's initial public offerings on the Hong Kong Stock Exchange, Z.ai at US$558 million on 8 January 2026, and Minimax at $620 million on 9 January, were contrasted to the hundredfold valuations of OpenAI at $500 billion and Anthropic at $183 billion.

Berger also noted that US restrictions on investment abroad combined with China's foreign investment controls simultaneously stifle US-China AI deals.

StepFun has attempted to differentiate itself with its focus on multimodal models incorporating text and video input.

== See also ==
- Artificial intelligence arms race
- Artificial Intelligence Cold War
- DeepSeek
- Mistral AI
- Thinking Machines Lab
- Upstage (company)
