= Sichuan Chengdu No.7 High School =

- 四川省成都市第七中学
- School campus
- Chengdu, Sichuan; China

Information
- Other name: Chengdu High School (成都中学)
- Type: Public
- Established: 1906
- Headmaster: Yi Guodong (易国栋)
- Colors: blue and white
- Website: cdqz.net

Sichuan Chengdu No.7 High School (四川省成都市第七中学), also known as Chengdu High School (成都中学), is a public high school in Wuhou, Chengdu, Sichuan, China.

Established in 1905, the school was formerly known as Chengdu County Middle School before 1952. It is one of the first key high schools designated by Ministry of Education of China. Considered to be the top high school in Sichuan Province and Western China, Chengdu No.7 High school is well known across China for its high-quality education and excellent academic performance in science and mathematics. It is one of the four "National Model High schools" in China. Most of the students in Chengdu No.7 High School are admitted in the top universities in China and prestigious universities in the world every year.

== History ==
A brief history of the school follows:

Mochi Academy (Mochi Shuyuan) was founded in the era of the Song dynasty of China.

In 1852, Mochi Academy was split into two academies, Mochi Academy and Furong Academy (Furong Shuyuan). The two academies then merged in 1905 and established Chengdu County Advanced Elementary School, a four-year school.

In 1931, Chengdu County High School, three-year senior middle class was established.

In 1950, Chengdu County Female High School was merged into Chengdu County Middle School.

In 1952, Chengdu County Middle School renamed as Chengdu No. 7 High School.

In 2014, Chengdu No.7 High School added sign "Chengdu High School".

== Notable alumni ==
- Chen Jiayong, metallurgist and chemical engineer, Member of China Academy of Sciences
- Li Yinyuan, physicist, Member of China Academy of Sciences
- Zhang Xingdong, biomedical scientist, Member of Chinese Academy of Engineering, Foreign member of National Academy of Engineering, U.S., Chairman of International Union of Societies for Biomaterials Science and Engineering, IUSBSE
- Fei-fei Li, Member of the National Academy of Engineering, the National Academy of Medicine, and the American Academy of Arts and Sciences
- Wang Xiaochuan, Founder & CEO of Sogou Inc.
- Chen Rui, President & CEO of Bilibili Inc., founder of Cheetah Mobile
- David Daokui Li, Economist, Director of the Center for China in the World Economy (CCWE) at Tsinghua University
- Wei Zhang, Recipient of the SASTRA Ramanujan Prize, Fellow of the American Mathematical Society, Professor at MIT

== Foreign Exchange Program ==
Chengdu No.7 High School has an exchange program with Jenks Public Schools, IGS Bonn Beuel and Brockenhurst College since 2003.

== Campus culture ==
There are four major student's Organisations in Chengdu No.7 High school: CYLC Committee (共青团委员会), student union (学生会), science and technology association (科协) and united clubs association (社联, UCA), which are administrating by students. There are more than 30 other club in the school such as Model United Nations, Volleyball club, Zhaohua literature Club, New Babel Club, English debating club and EYE cosplay clubs.

Students at Chengdu No. 7 High School have earned numerous awards such as the Vex Robotics World Championship, the National High School Students Leadership Championship, and the Grand Prize at National Financial Literacy Competition, to name a few.
