= Black Lake (company) =

Chinese industrial technology company

- Native name: 黑湖科技
- Type: Private
- Industry: Industrial technology
- Founded: 2016
- Founder: Zhou Yuxiang
- Key people: Zhou Yuxiang (CEO)
- Products: Manufacturing management system Industrial AI agents
- Website: https://www.blacklake.cn

Black Lake (Chinese: 黑湖科技; pinyin: Hēihú Kējì) is a Chinese industrial technology company headquartered in Shanghai. Founded in 2016 by Zhou Yuxiang, the company initially focused on digitising manufacturing operations and later expanded into artificial intelligence applications for industrial processes.

The company has raised several rounds of venture financing, including a Series C round of approximately US$77 million in 2021 and a Series D round of nearly RMB 1 billion in 2026.

== History ==
=== Founding and early growth: 2016–2020 ===
Black Lake was founded in 2016 by Zhou Yuxiang in Shanghai. The company initially focused on digitising manufacturing operations, replacing paper-based production processes with digital workflows and connecting production information across factories.

Its early manufacturing management system covered areas including production orders, material management, quality control, warehousing and logistics. Production workers could access production information and workflows using mobile devices.

In 2017, Black Lake completed a Series A financing round led by GGV Capital. The company subsequently raised RMB 150 million in Series B financing in 2019.

The company expanded its customer base among manufacturers in China and Southeast Asia. By 2021, its technology had been adopted by thousands of manufacturers and suppliers and was used by hundreds of thousands of production workers.

During the COVID-19 pandemic, Black Lake provided services for manufacturers dealing with supply-chain disruptions. Its platform was used for inventory management and supplier coordination, including by manufacturers involved in the production of protective equipment.

=== Expansion and Series C financing: 2021–2025 ===
In February 2021, Black Lake completed a Series C financing round of approximately US$77 million led by Temasek. China Renaissance and Lightspeed Venture Partners participated in the round, together with existing investors including GGV Capital, Bertelsmann Asia Investments, GSR Ventures and ZhenFund.

The financing supported the company's expansion in manufacturing and plans to enter Southeast Asian markets. Vietnam, Indonesia and Malaysia were among the markets identified for expansion.

By this period, Black Lake had built a substantial base among smaller manufacturers and suppliers. The manufacturing information and operational workflows accumulated through this earlier expansion subsequently provided a foundation for the company's development of industrial artificial intelligence applications.

In 2021, the World Economic Forum selected Black Lake as one of its Technology Pioneers. The programme included companies developing technologies for applications in industry and other sectors.

=== Shift toward industrial AI: 2022 ===
In 2022, Black Lake began shifting its focus toward industrial artificial intelligence after identifying limitations in using digital systems alone to address manufacturing decision-making. The company began investing more heavily in AI research and development following a study of industrial AI applications.

=== Development of industrial AI agents: 2023–present ===
From 2023, Black Lake began developing industrial AI agents for multiple manufacturing scenarios. The company's work expanded from connecting manufacturing information and workflows to using AI in areas such as design, quotation, scheduling, production and quality inspection.

In April 2026, Black Lake completed a Series D financing round of nearly RMB 1 billion. The financing was intended to support the development and deployment of industrial AI applications and international expansion.

One of the company's industrial AI applications is its CAD-to-Process Agent, which interprets product drawings and, taking into account a factory's equipment capabilities, process requirements and production practices, generates manufacturing process steps and corresponding technical requirements. The company has reported that drawing analysis that previously took hours can be completed in approximately one minute, with an accuracy rate of more than 95% in deployed environments.

In July 2026, Black Lake presented its industrial AI applications at the World Artificial Intelligence Conference in Shanghai. Its industrial AI agents covered areas including design, scheduling, production and quality inspection.

== Products and services ==
Black Lake provides a manufacturing management system covering production orders, materials management, quality control, warehousing and logistics.

The company has also developed industrial AI agents for manufacturing-related tasks, including production scheduling, quotation, design and quality inspection.

The CAD-to-Process Agent uses information from product drawings together with factory-specific equipment capabilities, process requirements and production practices to generate manufacturing process steps and technical requirements.

== Operations ==
Black Lake's business has primarily focused on manufacturing companies in China, with expansion into Southeast Asian markets including Vietnam, Indonesia and Malaysia.

In 2021, the company's technology was used by manufacturers and suppliers in China and Southeast Asia. Its customers included companies such as Tesla, L'Oréal, Xiaomi and Sinopec.

The company's customer base grew substantially among small and medium-sized manufacturers. By 2026, Black Lake had 35,000 factory customers, approximately 95% of which were small and medium-sized enterprises (SMEs).

The increase from thousands of manufacturers and suppliers using the company's technology by 2021 to 35,000 factory customers by 2026 marked a substantial expansion of its reach among smaller manufacturers.

== Funding ==
Black Lake's early financing included an approximately US$1 million angel round in 2016, followed by a Series A round led by GGV Capital in 2017 and a RMB 150 million Series B round in 2019.

The company's Series C round in 2021 raised approximately US$77 million. Temasek led the round, with participation from China Renaissance, Lightspeed Venture Partners and existing investors.

In 2026, Black Lake completed its Series D financing of nearly RMB 1 billion. The round brought total disclosed financing to approximately RMB 2 billion and was associated with the development of the company's industrial AI business and international expansion.

== Recognition ==
In 2021, Black Lake was selected as a Technology Pioneer by the World Economic Forum.

In 2025, Black Lake was selected as one of the first companies included in the World Economic Forum's MINDS programme, which recognizes organizations applying AI and frontier technologies to complex industrial and societal challenges.

In 2026, Black Lake was named to the Top 30 shortlist for the Super AI Leader (SAIL) Award at the World Artificial Intelligence Conference in Shanghai.
