= StepFun =

Chinese artificial intelligence company

Shanghai Jieyue Xingchen Intelligent Technology Co., Ltd
- Trade name: StepFun
- Native name: 上海阶跃星辰智能科技有限公司
- Type: Private
- Industry: Information technology
- Founded: 6 April 2023; 3 years ago
- Founders: Jiang Daxin; Zhu Yibo; Jiao Binxing
- Headquarters: Shanghai, China
- Area served: Worldwide
- Website: www.stepfun.com

Shanghai Jieyue Xingchen Intelligent Technology Co., Ltd, known as StepFun, is an artificial intelligence (AI) company based in Shanghai, China. It has been dubbed one of China's 6 "AI Tiger" companies by investors.

== Background ==
StepFun was founded in April 2023 by former Microsoft employees. Investors include Tencent, Qiming Venture Partners and Shanghai State-owned Capital Investment.

In July 2025 at the World Artificial Intelligence Conference, StepFun announced the "Model-Chip Ecosystem Innovation Alliance" which consisted of Chinese developers of large language models (LLMs) and AI chip manufacturers. This included companies such as Huawei, Biren Technology, Moore Threads and Enflame. Another second alliance named the "Shanghai General Chamber of Commerce AI Committee" was also established that included StepFun, SenseTime, MiniMax, MetaX and Iluvatar CoreX.

On 25 February 2026, it was reported that StepFun was seeking an initial public offering on the Hong Kong Stock Exchange.

StepFun focuses on multimodal models which are designed to understand multiple types of input data such as text, video and audio.

In September 2026, a joint advisory from the FBI, NSA and CISA named StepFun among six Chinese companies it said had carried out distillation attacks on American AI models; it said StepFun had distilled Claude and GPT models to improve the coding abilities of its Step 4 model. China's government called the accusations groundless.

== Products ==
In July 2024 at the World Artificial Intelligence Conference, StepFun officially launched Step-2, a trillion-parameter LLM, along with the Step-1.5V multimodal model and the Step-1X image generation model.

In February 2025, StepFun and Geely jointly announced the open-sourcing of two multimodal large models to global developers. They were Step-Video-T2V and Step-Audio.

In July 2025, StepFun released Step 3. The Model-Chip Ecosystem Innovation Alliance aimed to optimize Step 3 for domestic chips.

In April 2025, Step-R1-V-Mini was released. It is a multimodal reasoning model designed for visual interpretation and image understanding.

In February 2026, Step 3.5 Flash, a mixture-of-experts model with 196 billion parameters and 11 billion active parameters was released under the free and open-source Apache 2.0 license. It supports tool use and a 256k token context window.

On 13 October 2026, StepFun launched the STEPX Neo, a smartphone priced at CN¥3,999 running Step AOS, an operating system the company said was rebuilt around an on-device AI agent, Amoo, rather than adding AI as a separate app. The launch price was described as a "full-stack" bundle covering the hardware, software and a year of access to StepFun's AI token plan.

== Models ==
List of StepFun models
| Name | Release date | License | Ref. |
|---|---|---|---|
| Step 3.5 Flash | February 2026 | Apache 2.0 | |
| Step 3.7 Flash | May 2026 | Apache 2.0 | |
| Step 5 Preview | September 18, 2026 | Closed weights | |

== See also ==
- List of artificial intelligence companies
- List of large language models
- Lists of open-source artificial intelligence software
- Six AI tigers
