= Moonshot AI =

Chinese artificial intelligence company

Beijing Moonshot AI Technology Co., Ltd.
- Native name: 北京月之暗面科技有限公司
- Type: Private
- Industry: Artificial Intelligence
- Founded: March 2023; 3 years ago
- Founders: Yang Zhilin; Zhou Xinyu; Wu Yuxin
- Headquarters: JD Technology Building, Haidian District, Beijing, China
- Area served: Worldwide
- Key people: Yang Zhilin (CEO)
- Products: Kimi (chatbot); Kimi Researcher; Kimi Agent; Kimi Code; Kimi Audio; Kimina Prover
- Revenue: US$200 million (ARR, April 2026)
- Number of employees: 300 (2026)
- Website: moonshot.ai

Moonshot AI (Moonshot; Chinese: 月之暗面; pinyin: Yuè Zhī Ànmiàn; lit. 'Dark Side of the Moon') is an artificial intelligence (AI) company based in Beijing, China. It releases the Kimi series of open weights large language models. It is one of China's six "AI tigers". Its Kimi K3, released July 2026, is the largest open weights model family ever, at 2.8 trillion parameters. Founded in Beijing by Yang Zhilin, Zhou Xinyu, and Wu Yuxin in March 2023 at the outset of the AI boom, the company achieved a valuation of US$35 billion by July 2026, the second most valuable privately held AI pure play in China, after DeepSeek. Major investors include Alibaba Group and Tencent.

Moonshot serves Kimi via web, API, and the Kimi Code command-line agent. These are capable of multimodal image and video input, and their "Swarm" feature utilizes hundreds of sub-agents for deep research. Kimi K3's performance led the AI industry in China and rivalled frontier models from US companies OpenAI and Anthropic. Despite its open weights, K3's custom software license requires revenue sharing of up to 30% for inference providers generating over US$20 million annually.

Kimi models have been used as the basis or for post-training of US models, including Thinking Machines Lab's Inkling, Cursor's Composer 2, and Cognition AI's Devin AI, Fireworks AI's Ember-1, and Harvey's Tenet. Throughout 2026, Anthropic accused Moonshot and other Chinese competitors of distilling its Claude models and covertly routing requests to Claude. From April, a US congressional committee pressed American companies over their use of Kimi and other Chinese AI models.

== History ==
Moonshot was founded in March 2023 by Yang Zhilin, Zhou Xinyu and Wu Yuxin who were schoolfriends at Tsinghua University. Yang had previously worked at Google Brain, Meta Platforms, and Huawei developing Huawei PanGu. It was launched on the 50th anniversary of the release of Yang's favourite album, Pink Floyd's The Dark Side of the Moon, which inspired the name of the company. It is headquartered in the JD Technology Building, in Beijing's Haidian district.

Yang's stated goal for founding Moonshot AI is to build foundation models to achieve artificial general intelligence. Yang's three milestones are long context length, multimodal world model, and a scalable general architecture capable of continuous self-improvement without human input.

In October 2023, the company released the first version of its chatbot, Kimi, which was capable of processing up to 200,000 Chinese characters per conversation.

In June 2024, it was reported that Moonshot was planning to enter the US market. An insider revealed Moonshot was developing products for the US market, including an AI role-playing chat application called Ohai as well as a music video generator called Noisee. In response, Moonshot stated it had no plans to develop and release overseas products.

In January 2026, Moonshot released Kimi K2.5, a multimodal upgrade to Kimi K2 that added native vision capabilities through a 400-million-parameter vision encoder called MoonViT. The model can process both images and video, enabling agentic tasks such as replicating website user journeys from video demonstrations alone. The K2 model was released just 3 months prior. K2.5 provided the basis for US models including Cursor's Composer 2 in March and Thinking Machines Lab's Inkling in July. It introduced a "Agent Swarm" feature, which allows the model to direct up to 100 sub-agents to "search, generate, analyze, and organize information", and Kimi Code, a command-line interface AI coding agent.

In February 2026, Anthropic accused Moonshot, alongside DeepSeek and MiniMax Group, of violating Anthropic's terms of service by using thousands of fraudulent accounts to generate millions of conversations with Claude to train its own large language models in what is termed a "distillation attack".

From April 2026, the United States House Committee on Homeland Security pressed American companies DoorDash and Anysphere (maker of Cursor), over their use of Kimi models for some engineering tasks. The same month, Moonshoot reached US$300 million annual recurring revenue. Kimi K3 was used as the basis of post-trained US models, including Cognition AI's Devin AI, Fireworks AI's Ember-1, and Harvey and Fireworks AI's lawbot Tenet.

On 10 July 2026, Moonshot, the Agricultural Bank of China, and American Express jointly announced two credit cards, which return Kimi memberships based on usage.

On 10 September 2026, Anthropic accused Moonshot of routing user requests to its model series Claude, then training models on these responses. The report claimed Moonshot used 5,380 accounts via proxy servers in Singapore and Japan, and made over 23 million exchanges mainly with Claude Opus, as well as extracting Claude's chain of thought, which is designed to only be summarized for the user in "thinking signature" form. The Cyberspace Administration of China, a Chinese regulator and censor agency, initiated an investigation into the allegations, with the investigation also reviewing similar claims against DeepSeek. The investigation was observed as a cooperative step with the United States in the build-up to Xi Jinping's state visit to the US later that month.

== Funding and investments ==
Moonshot was valued at US$300 million when it received its initial funding of US$60 million and had 40 employees.

In February 2024, Alibaba Group led a US$1 billion funding round for Moonshot, which gave it a valuation of US$2.5 billion. Alibaba acquired 36% stake and invested US $0.8 billion in Moonshot AI.

In August 2024, Tencent and Gaorong Capital joined as investors in a US$300 million funding round that valued Moonshot at US$3.3 billion.

In October 2025, Moonshot was reportedly nearing the completion of a new funding round of approximately US$600 million, led by IDG Capital with participation from existing investors including Tencent, valuing the company at US$3.8 billion pre-money.

In March 2026, Moonshot was reportedly considering an initial public offering on the Hong Kong Stock Exchange.

On 30 July 2026, Moonshot closed a funding round at a $35 billion valuation.

On 31 July 2026, Bloomberg News reported Alibaba Cloud supplied Moonshot access to 20,000 Nvidia H200 GPUs. Alibaba denied providing H200s to Moonshot. The report also alleged Moonshot could access the latest Nvidia Blackwell GPUs via southeast Asia.

== Products and research ==
=== Kimi ===
In October 2023, Moonshot launched its first AI chatbot, Kimi, whose name comes from Yang's English nickname. By 2024, the FT described Kimi as one of the leading domestic rivals to Baidu's Ernie Bot.

In March 2024, Moonshot claimed Kimi could handle 2 million Chinese characters per conversation which was a significant upgrade from the previous version that could only handle 200,000. Due to the increased number of users, on 21 March, Kimi suffered an outage for two days and Moonshot had to issue an apology.

In May 2024, Kimi had six tiers of plans ranging from 5.2 yuan for four days to 399 yuan for a year of priority use.

As of August 2024, Kimi ranked third in active monthly users according to aicpb.com.

On 20 January 2025, Kimi K1.5 was released. Moonshot claimed it matched the performance of OpenAI o1 in mathematics, coding, and multimodal reasoning capabilities.

In June 2025, Kimi dropped in popularity to seventh place in active monthly users.

In July 2025, the company released the weights for Kimi K2, a large language model with 1 trillion total parameters. The model uses a mixture-of-experts (MoE) architecture, where 32 billion parameters are active during inference. K2 was trained on 15.5 trillion tokens of data and is released under a modified MIT license. Kimi K2 is an open source LLM, meaning that it can be downloaded and built upon by users. The day after its release, Kimi K2 was the most downloaded model on Hugging Face. On 9 September 2025, Moonshot AI released an updated version of K2, Kimi-K2-Instruct-0905, which further increased its performance in agentic coding tasks and doubled its context window from 128K tokens to 256K tokens.

In November 2025, Moonshot released Kimi K2 Thinking, an open-source update to Kimi K2 designed for advanced reasoning and agentic tasks. The model, trained for approximately $4.6 million, features a 1-trillion-parameter MoE architecture with 32 billion active parameters and supports up to 256,000-token contexts. It can execute 200-300 sequential tool calls autonomously and uses native INT4 quantization for efficiency. Moonshot reported scores above GPT-5 and Claude Sonnet 4.5 on tests including Humanity's Last Exam (44.9%), BrowseComp (60.2%), and SWE-Bench Verified (71.3%). It is released under a modified MIT license requiring attribution for products exceeding 100 million monthly users or $20 million in monthly revenue.

On 16 July 2026, Moonshot released Kimi K3, the first open model to reach 2.8 trillion parameters. Its strong performance as the largest open weights model ever, and a frontier model rivalling top US models led to outlets dubbing it a "DeepSeek moment"; referring to the release of DeepSeek R1 in January 2025. Designed for long-horizon coding, knowledge work, and reasoning, model outperformed Claude Opus 4.8 max and GPT-5.5 high on benchmarks, losing out only to Claude Fable 5 and GPT-5.6 Sol, while offering prices comparable to the lower-performing model Claude Sonnet. On independent private long-horizon knowledge work evaluation, Kimi K3 reached an overall Elo of 1547, +732 points from Kimi K2.6 and behind only Claude Fable 5. K3 can optimize GPU kernels, produce research results on frontier physics, and edit video. Notably, K3 "edited its own teaser video from 56 source clips, handling clip selection, motion-matched cuts, frame-accurate beat synchronization, audio processing, and multiple rounds of revision". K3's Agent Swarm feature utilized up to 300 sub-agents. Under K3's custom license, hosters selling access to K3 as a service making over US$20 million annually must enter a commercial agreement with Moonshot with revenue sharing of up to 30%.

In October 2026, Kimi K3.1 Pro was released, an AI upgrade for financial research, 3D modeling and coding.

=== Mooncake serving platform ===
Mooncake is the platform that serves Moonshot's Kimi chatbot and processes 100 billion tokens daily. Moonshot was awarded the Erik Riedel Best Paper Award at the USENIX FAST conference for the paper detailing the architecture of Mooncake.

=== Scaling Muon optimizer ===
In the Moonshot and UCLA joint paper "Muon is Scalable for LLM Training", the researchers claim to have successfully scaled the Muon optimizer, which was previously known to have strong results in training small language models, to train a 16 billion parameter mixture of experts (MoE) large language model with 3 billion active parameters. The researchers indicate that Muon improves computational efficiency by a factor of 2 compared to the standard optimizer, AdamW, in training large models. The researchers have open sourced their Muon optimizer implementation and the pretrained and instruction-tuned checkpoints.

=== Scaling reinforcement learning with LLMs ===
In their technical report on the Kimi K1.5 model, Moonshot researchers outline their reinforcement learning methods, which they claim enabled the model to achieve state-of-the-art reasoning capabilities on par with OpenAI's o1 model. The researchers note that long context scaling and improved policy optimization methods were key, without relying on complex techniques like Monte Carlo tree search, value functions, and process reward models.

== See also ==
- Reasoning model
- Baichuan
- MiniMax
- Z.ai
