= Baichuan =

Chinese artificial intelligence company

Beijing Baichuan Intelligent Technology Co., Ltd.
- Native name: 北京百川智能科技有限公司
- Type: Private
- Industry: Information technology
- Founded: 10 April 2023; 3 years ago
- Founder: Wang Xiaochuan
- Headquarters: Beijing, China
- Number of employees: 170 (2023)
- Website: baichuan-ai.com

Baichuan AI (Baichuan; Chinese: 百川智能; pinyin: Bǎichuān Zhìnéng) is an artificial intelligence (AI) company based in Beijing, China. As of 2024, it has been dubbed one of China's 6 "AI Tiger" companies by investors.

== Background ==
Baichuan was founded in April 2023 by Wang Xiaochuan who had founded Sogou and was previously its CEO. Wang named the company after the phrase "A Hundred Rivers" and had secured $50 million in seed capital. He also reached out to former subordinates at Sogou to join the new company.

In October 2023, a $300 million fundraiser was held for Baichuan. Investors included Tencent, Alibaba Group, Shunwei Capital and Xiaomi.

In July 2024, Alibaba Group participated in a $691 million fundraiser for Baichuan valuing it at $2.8 billion.

In March 2025, Baichuan announced it was restructuring its team to focus on applying AI to healthcare.

== Products ==
=== Baichuan ===
In June 2023 Baichuan launched Bachuan1, an open-source large language model which was used by researchers at universities.

In November 2023, Baichuan2 was released. Its context window could handle around 350,000 Chinese characters.

In January 2024 and May 2024, Baichuan3 and Baichuan4 were released respectively.

== See also ==
- Six AI tigers
- MiniMax (company) – Chinese artificial intelligence company
- Moonshot AI – Chinese artificial intelligence company
- Zhipu AI – Chinese artificial intelligence company
