= World Internet Conference =

Annual Chinese government event

World Internet Conference 世界互联网大会
- Status: Active
- Locations: Wuzhen, Zhejiang
- Country: China
- Inaugurated: November 19, 2014; 11 years ago
- Organizer: Cyberspace Administration of China; Zhejiang Provincial People's Government
- Website: www.wicinternet.org

World Internet Conference
- Simplified Chinese: 世界互联网大会
- Traditional Chinese: 世界互聯網大會
Transcriptions
Standard Mandarin
- Hanyu Pinyin: Shìjiè Hùliánwǎng Dàhuì

Wuzhen Summit
- Simplified Chinese: 乌镇峰会
- Traditional Chinese: 烏鎮峰會
Transcriptions
Standard Mandarin
- Hanyu Pinyin: Wūzhèn Fēnghuì

The World Internet Conference (WIC), also known as the Wuzhen Summit, is an annual international conference on global Internet technology development, innovation, issues, and policies. It is held in Wuzhen, Zhejiang, China. First held in 2014, the conference is jointly hosted by the Cyberspace Administration of China and the Zhejiang Provincial People's Government.

== Annual gatherings ==
=== 2014 ===
The inaugural World Internet Conference took place from November 19 to 21, 2014, with the topic "Connectivity, Sharing and Governance". Li Keqiang, the Premier of the State Council, engaged with Chinese and foreign delegates at the conference.

At the first World Internet Conference in 2014, an unknown party distributed a draft joint statement affirming the right of individual nations to develop, use, and govern the Internet, a concept Chinese Communist Party (CCP) general secretary and paramount leader Xi Jinping calls cyber sovereignty. Attendees received a draft of the statement overnight, slid under their hotel doors. As some objected to the statement, the organizers made no mention of it in the conference's final day.

=== 2015 ===
The second World Internet Conference in 2015 was attended by notable figures including co-founder of Alibaba Group Jack Ma, Chinese leader Xi Jinping, Russian Prime Minister Dmitry Medvedev and the prime ministers of Pakistan, Kazakhstan, and Kyrgyzstan. Xi promoted his concept of "Internet sovereignty", urging the world to "respect each country's Internet sovereignty, respect each country's right to choose their own development path and management model of the internet". Xi's speech was praised by Ma. The official Chinese media commented that Xi Jinping's speech showed China was bullish on Internet growth and China would build a "Digital Silk Road for Win-Win Cooperation-Information Infrastructure Partnership".

The second World Internet Conference released the Wuzhen Initiative (Chinese: 乌镇倡议; pinyin: Wūzhèn Chàngyì), which calls on all countries to promote Internet development, foster cultural diversity in cyber space, share the fruits of Internet development, ensure peace and security in cyber space, and improve global Internet governance. During the Conference a high-level advisory council (HAC for short) for the WIC's organizing committee secretariat was established, and the Wuzhen Initiative was proposed. The initiative was released with the conference. The Wuzhen Initiative includes specifically mentions the Internet needs and online protection of teenagers. The ultimate goal of the Initiative is to build a common spiritual homeland for all people on this planet. Fadi Chehadé, the president of ICANN, thinks the Wuzhen Initiative is a good step in stimulating technological innovation and new approaches to innovate and govern the Internet.

The 2015 World Internet Conference organizers denied entry to reporters for certain U.S. media outlets, such as The New York Times. In response, Reporters Without Borders called for a boycott of the 2015 World Internet Conference. The event was criticized by Amnesty International, which called on technology companies to boycott the conference; it urged tech firms to reject China's position, calling it an attempt to promote censorship (on fake news).

In December 2015, Fadi Chehadé announced that, after he leaves his post as ICANN CEO in March 2016, he will become co-chair of a newly formed advisory committee to the World Internet Conference. The first meeting of the committee will take place in mid-2016.

=== 2016 ===
The 3rd World Internet Conference occurred from November 16 to 18, 2016, under the theme "Innovation-driven Internet Development for the Benefit of All - Building a Community of Common Future in Cyberspace." Former Australian prime minister Bob Hawke, participated in the conference.

=== 2017 ===
In December 2017, the 4th annual conference was held in China. Apple Inc.'s Tim Cook and Google's Sundar Pichai made their first appearances at Wuzhen Summit. Pu Meng, Chairman of Qualcomm China, gave a keynote speech about advances of 5G and AI.

=== 2018 ===
In November 2018, Xinhua's World first artificial intelligence (AI) anchor makes debut at the 5th annual conference that opens in China.

=== 2019 ===
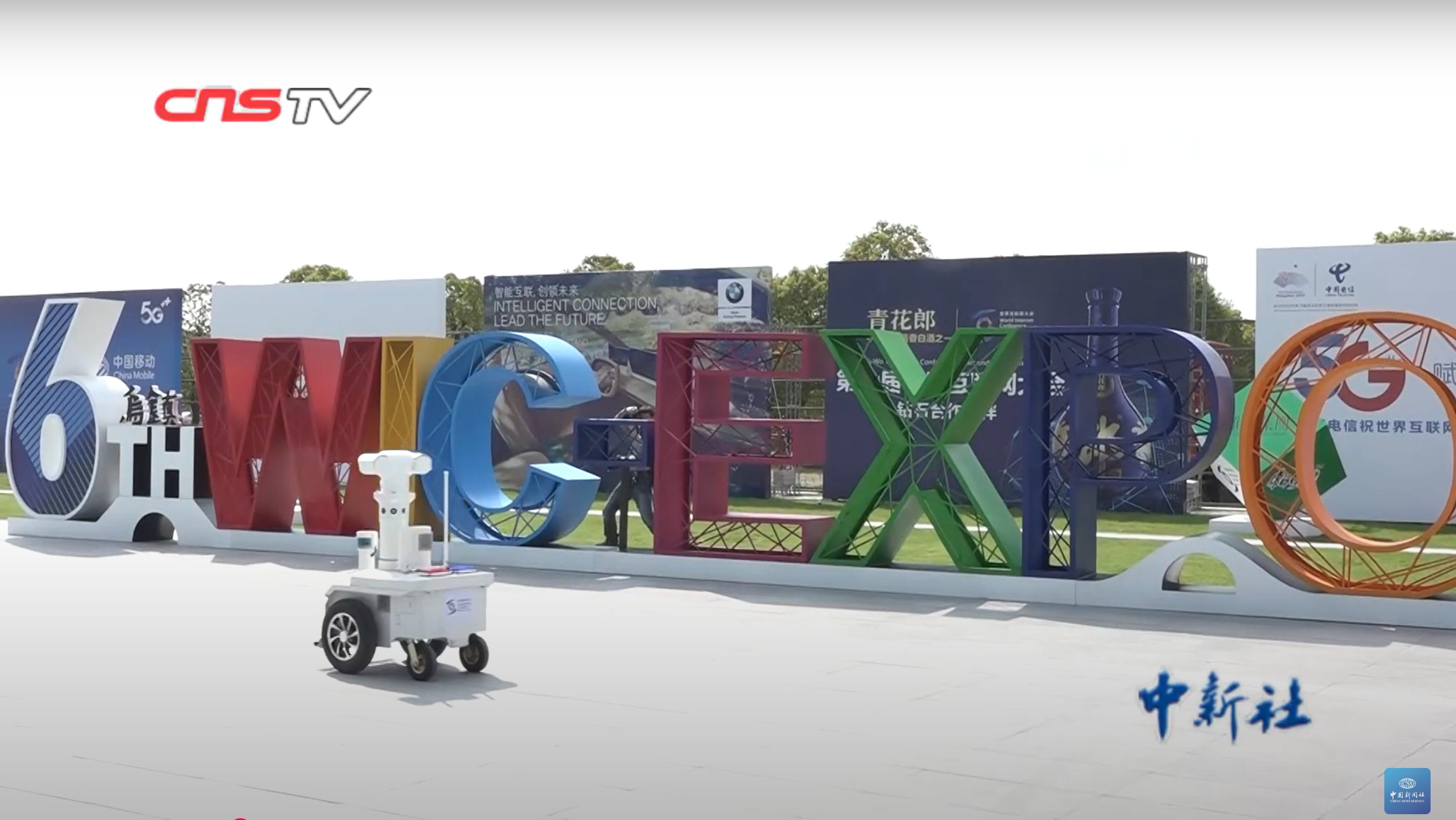
the 6th World Internet Conference in 2019

The 6th edition of the World Internet Conference was held on October 20–21, 2019, with the theme of "Joining Hands in Constructing a Community of Shared Future in Cyberspace".

=== 2020 ===
The 7th World Internet Conference was not conducted in 2020 due to the repercussions of the COVID-19 pandemic and was substituted by the World Internet Conference-Internet Development Forum, scheduled to take place in Wuzhen, Zhejiang Province, from November 23 to 24.

=== 2021 ===
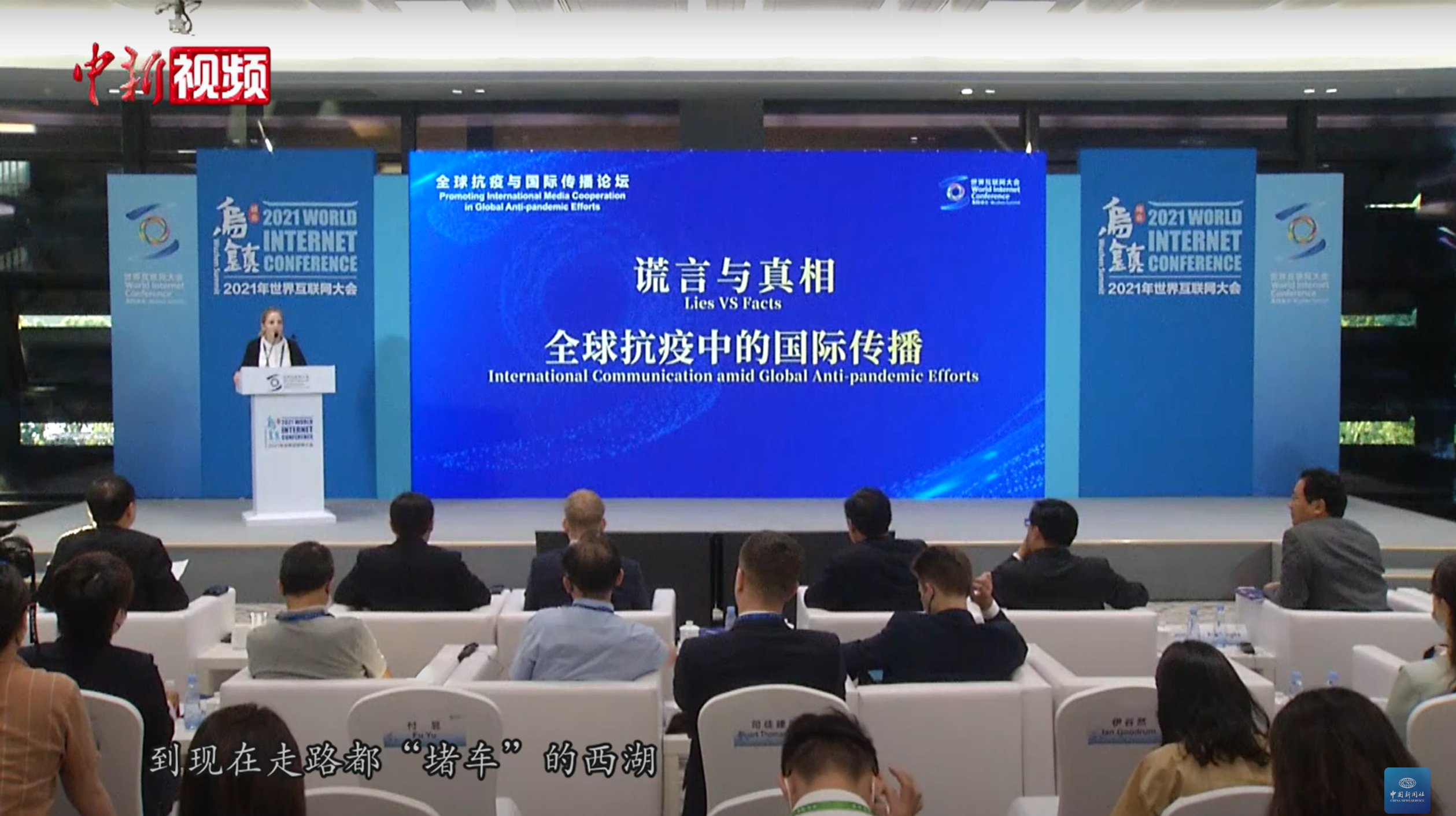
World Internet Conference in 2021

The 8th World Internet Conference occurred in Wuzhen, Zhejiang Province, from September 26 to 28, 2021, under the subject "Towards a New Era of Digital Civilization—Building a Community of Destiny in Cyberspace Together." The conference was conducted in a hybrid format, featuring both in-person and virtual components. A live venue was established in Wuzhen for various activities, and some distinguished people were asked to attend online.

=== 2022 ===
The World Internet Conference's worldwide organization was created on July 12, 2022, and the Wuzhen Summit of the 2022 World Internet Conference commenced on November 9, 2022, in Wuzhen, Zhejiang Province.

=== 2023 ===
The World Internet Conference commenced on November 8, 2023, in Wuzhen, Zhejiang Province. The conference centers on the regulation of artificial intelligence.

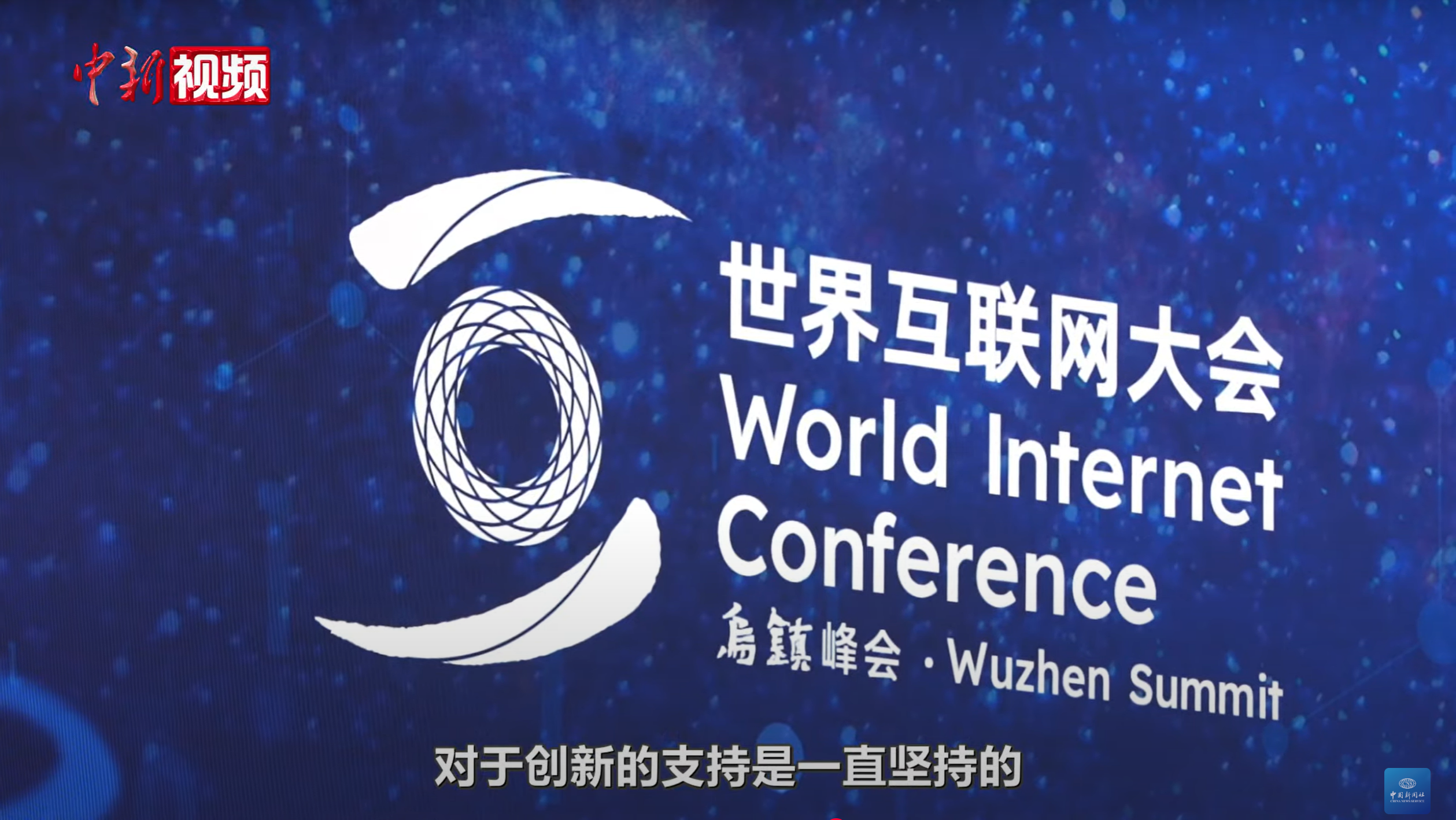
2024 World Internet Conference

=== 2024 ===
On November 22, 2024, the Wuzhen Summit of the World Internet Conference 2024, entitled "Embracing a People-centered and AI-for-good Digital Future—Building a Community with a Shared Future in Cyberspace," finished its proceedings.

=== 2025 ===
The 2025 World Internet Conference opened in Wuzhen, Zhejiang Province, on November 7, 2025. Li Shulei, a member of the Politburo of the Chinese Communist Party and minister of the Publicity Department of the Chinese Communist Party, attended the opening ceremony and delivered a keynote speech. The summit's theme was "Jointly Building an Open, Cooperative, Secure, and Inclusive Digital and Intelligent Future—Working Together to Build a Community with a Shared Future in Cyberspace."

== See also ==
- China Internet Civilization Conference
- World Artificial Intelligence Conference
- Future of Go Summit
