= Yitu Technology =

Chinese facial recognition company

Shanghai Yitu Network Technology Co., Ltd.
- Trade name: Yitu Technology
- Native name: 依图科技
- Industry: Artificial intelligence; facial recognition systems
- Founded: 2012; 14 years ago
- Founder: Leo Zhu
- Headquarters: 701 Yunjin Rd, Xuhui District, Shanghai
- Website: www.yitutech.com

Yitu Technology, stylized as YITU, is a Shanghai-based artificial intelligence company that develops facial recognition systems. The company was founded in 2012 by Leo Zhu and Lin Chenxi. Yitu's software, branded as Dragonfly Eye, is used by public security bureaus throughout China to identify individuals and vehicles.

Leo Zhu, the company's CEO, received his Ph.D. in statistics from University of California, Los Angeles and conducted post-doctoral research at the MIT Computer Science and Artificial Intelligence Laboratory. Yitu is financially backed by the Industrial and Commercial Bank of China, Sequoia Capital, and Hillhouse Capital. Yitu's chief operating officer, Zhang Xiaoping, also serves as the chief investment officer of G42.

== History ==
In 2017, Yitu took first place in a contest for facial recognition algorithms held by the Office of the Director of National Intelligence. In 2018, Yitu partnered with Huawei to enhance its smart cities projects. The same year, Yitu established an office in Singapore and signed a deal with the Royal Malaysia Police for facial recognition software. In 2019, the Chinese government named Yitu one of its "national champions" in artificial intelligence. In 2021, Yitu withdrew its initial public offering application on the Shanghai Stock Exchange STAR Market following regulatory scrutiny and announced its intention to list on the Hong Kong Stock Exchange.

=== US sanctions ===
In October 2019, the United States Department of Commerce added Yitu to the Entity List for alleged involvement in human rights abuses in Xinjiang. In December 2021, the United States Department of the Treasury added Yitu to its "Chinese military-industrial complex companies" (CMIC) blacklist. In January 2024, the United States Department of Defense named Yitu on its list of "Chinese Military Companies Operating in the United States."

== See also ==
- Mass surveillance in China
- Artificial intelligence industry in China
