= Wang Xiaochuan =

Chinese entrepreneur (born 1978)

- 王小川
- Born: 3 October 1978 (age 47); Chengdu, Sichuan, China
- Education: Tsinghua University
- Known for: Founder of Sogou and Baichuan

Wang Xiaochuan (Chinese: 王小川; pinyin: Wáng Xiǎochuān; born 3 October 1978) is a Chinese Internet entrepreneur and investor. He is the founder and former chief executive officer of Sogou. He has also founded Baichuan, an artificial intelligence company.

== Early life and education ==
Wang was born in 1978 in Chengdu, Sichuan Province. He began using computers and writing software when he was seven. Since elementary school, Wang received prizes in programming contests aimed at middle school students.

In 1990, Wang ranked NO.1 in the city-wide admission exam to Chengdu No.7 High School (middle school).

In 1993, Wang was admitted to Chengdu No.7 High School (high school) after winning the first prize in the National Mathematics Competition.

In 1994, Wang completed all proof of elementary geometry proposition for the first time, using a microcomputer with Wu's elimination method. For this work, he won the Yilida Youth Invention Award (an award initiated by Nobel Laureate Chen Ning Yang). In 1994, when Vice Premier Li Lanqing visited Chengdu Seventh Middle School, he saw Wang's computer operation performance.

In 1996, he won a gold medal at the 8th International Olympiad in Informatics (IOI) and was admitted to Tsinghua University.

Wang studied at Tsinghua University and earned Bachelor of Science and master's degrees in computer science and an EMBA degree there. Wang also earned his Doctorate in Computer Science and Technology from Tsinghua University.

== Career ==
Wang entered China's Internet startup sector while still an undergraduate student. In 1999, he participated in the creation of the online alumni directory of ChinaRen.com as a part-time technical manager. His work continued after ChinaRen. In 2003, after completing his postgraduate studies at Tsinghua University, Wang joined Sohu after ChinaRen was acquired by Sohu. Wang's talent attracted the attention of Charles Zhang, the founder and CEO of Sohu and Wang rose from senior technical manager to senior technical director, deputy president, senior vice-president, and CTO. At 27, Wang became the youngest Vice President of this company. Wang was appointed as the CTO of Sohu at the age of 31.

In 2003, Wang established Sohu's R&D Center. Wang recruited students in the computer department of Tsinghua University, international gold medals in the computer Olympic Games and top winners in the college entrance examination to form a team. Wang launched Sogou Search in 2004. In 2006, he invented the Sogou intelligent Input Method, which later became China's most popular input method, anchoring Sogou as China's No.2 Internet property by user numbers. In 2008, Wang proposed the "Input-Browser-Search" internet business model, namely the "three-stage rocket model".

On 16 March 2007, Wang led Sogou and the department of computer science and technology of Tsinghua University to establish Sogou Tsinghua joint laboratory. In 2016, Wang initiated the donation of 180 million RMB from Sogou to Tsinghua to establish the Tiangong Institute for Intelligent Computing of Tsinghua University. Wang was named co-chair of the institute. Wang also led Sogou to establish SogouT-16, a free-of-charge public Chinese Web collection, which has provided resources for further academic research in computer science.

In 2010, after facilitating the spin-off of Sogou from Sohu Wang became its CEO.

Two months after Wang took office in 2010, Alibaba invested $15 million in exchange for 10% of Sogou's shares. In 2013, Wang persuaded Tencent to invest $448 million in Sogou and merged Tencent's search department into Sogou.

On 9 November 2017, under Wang's leadership, Sogou was listed on the New York Stock Exchange (NYSE) under the ticker symbol "SOGO", at a valuation of $5 billion.

On 15 October 2021, Wang resigned as CEO of Sogou and announced that he would open a new chapter in the medical field. In recent years, Wang has invested in the field of medical technology, including Dr. Chunyu, a listed company of telemedicine platform, a Chinese medicine consulting service Xiaolu traditional Chinese medicine, Airdoc Technology, the first "AI medical stock" listed in Hong Kong, and DeepCare, an AI oral imaging company. Wang wrote, "my curiosity about life science has been lingering in my mind for the past 20 years. In the next 20 years, if I can make my own contributions to the development of health care and life science, and to the improvement of public health, I will live a fuller life".

In April 2023, Wang founded Baichuan, an artificial intelligence company.

Wang was included in Time's 2024 list of the "100 Most Influential People in AI".
