= Sogou =

Chinese search engine

Sogou, Inc. 搜狗公司
- Website type: Private company
- Traded as: SOGO
- Founded: 9 August 2010; 16 years ago
- Headquarters: Beijing, China
- Owner: Tencent
- Creator: Wang Xiaochuan (CEO)
- Industry: Internet
- Revenue: US$924.664 million (2020)
- Operating income: US$−108.221 million (2020)
- Net income: US$−140.159 million (2020)
- Employees: 3,000
- Parent: Sohu (2004–2021); Tencent (2021–present)
- Website: www.sogou.com

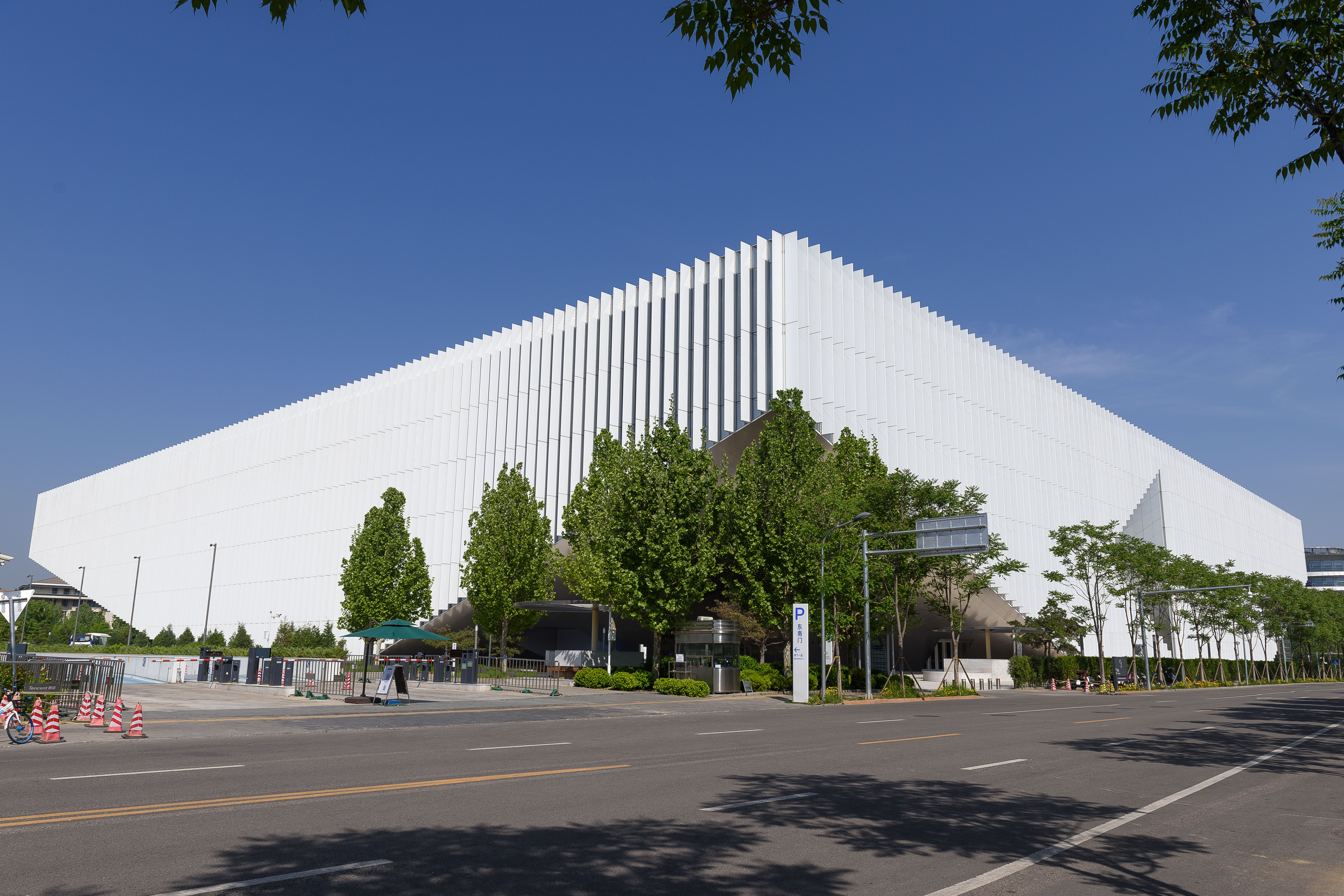
Sogou is headquartered in Tencent Beijing office.

Sogou, Inc. (Chinese: 搜狗; pinyin: Sōugǒu; lit. 'Search-dog') is a Chinese technology company and subsidiary of Tencent. It started as Sohu's search division, later becoming a separate company, and stayed under Sohu's control until Tencent acquired it.

The offices of Sogou are located in Beijing on the southeast corner of Tsinghua University. Sogou also has offices in Chengdu, co-located within Tencent's office building. In April 2018, Sogou established a R&D center in Guangzhou.

== History ==
Wang Xiaochuan was hired by Sohu.com after graduating from Tsinghua University and tasked to create a new search engine. He continued to lead a small team of students from the nearby Tsinghua University on the project. The Sogou search engine was launched on August 3, 2004, and operated as a separate division within Sohu. In 2006, Sogou invented Sogou Pinyin, the eventual dominant input platform used in China for both desktop PC and mobile. In 2007, Sogou established a search curriculum with Tsinghua University to recruit future engineers and stimulate development. Wang Xiaochuan is known as the "Goalie of the East Gate" for the relentless recruitment from Tsinghua. In 2008, Sogou launched the Sogou Browser.

By 2010, search revenue share was under 1%. Wang Xiaochuan flew to meet Jack Ma, founder of Alibaba.com and convinced him of an equity investment. In return, Sohu.com agreed to spin Sogou from a separate division to an independent company, with a separate P&L line. Pre-IPO stock options were granted to employees for the first time.

By 2012, growth had risen by over 300% and Sohu.com purchased shares back from Jack Ma. It started to seek out new partnerships by 2013. Wang Xiaochuan met with Pony Ma, CEO of Tencent, and convinced him of a merger. The search engine SoSo.com merged with Sogou and an equity investment of US$448 million was made. By 2014, Sogou became the default search engine for QQ.com. Also, in 2014, Sogou became the only search engine to be able to search WeChat public accounts. By early 2015, Sogou became profitable.

Sogou debuted on New York Stock Exchange on 9 November 2017, under the ticker "SOGO". The IPO raised $585 million offering in a bid to accelerate the use of artificial intelligence in its business. In 2018, Sogou reported net sales of $1.1 billion, a net income of $98 million, and reported over $1 billion in cash. Their annual growth rate was 24% over the previous year. In late July 2020, Chinese technology company Tencent made a $2.1 billion bid to buy Sogou, with the decision to accept and regulatory permissions still pending.

According to iResearch statistics, Sogou accounted for 16.7% of the mobile search market share in China.

== Products ==
Sogou 搜狗
- Available in: Chinese
- Website: sogou.com
- Commercial: Yes
- Users: 560 million
- Launched: 3 August 2004; 22 years ago
- Current status: Active

=== Search engine and web applications ===
Sogou's web application products are designed to classify online information, such as music, picture, video clip, news, map and vertical information. As of 2017, it has an index of 10 billion pages. As of 2018, over 90% of the company's revenues are from search advertising.

In October 2017, Sogou began testing a general search engine within WeChat, which would allow users to access the internet within the app. Since 2013, Sogou has only been able to search and index the contents of WeChat official accounts. On the first quarter conference call, 2018, Sogou provided an update, resulting in a 30% improvement in click through rate. In September 2018, Sogou disclosed an annual agreement with Tencent to continue the search integration experiment until 2023, with annual renewals. In the same filing, Sogou has designated the default search engine for Tencent's QQ products.

=== Sogou Input Method ===
Initially released in 2006, Sogou Pinyin makes use of its search engine technique which are the analysis and categorization of the most popular words or phrases on the Internet. In 2007, Sogou won a patent infringement case against Google for copying their IME.

=== Sogou Browser ===
Launched in December 2008, the Sogou browser adopts a "dual-core" (Google Chrome's WebKit and Internet Explorer's Trident layout engines) technique (introduced in 2010) and it connects to the cloud to 'recognize malicious websites and software'. According to Statcounter (November 2019), Sogou's desktop browser holds a 1.6% market share in China and is ranked the #7 desktop browser used in China.

=== Sogou Voice Recognition Technology ===
Sogou has been developing voice recognition technology since 2011. At the World Internet Conference in November 2016, CEO Wang Xiaochuan demonstrated a voice translation in both Chinese and English translation with up to 95% accuracy. There has been a rush to partner with manufacturers in connecting devices to the internet between competitors. Sogou is currently China's largest search engine by voice.

=== Hardware Products ===
In 2017, Sogou through their Internet of Things subsidiary, sold over 1 million smartwatches in China. The GPS positioning smartwatch focuses on the child market.

On 22 March 2018, Sogou launched the Travel Translator and Travel Pen, which sold out on the first day. The company estimates it will exceed the sales of its smartwatches.

=== Sogou Lip Recognition Technology ===
On 15 December 2017, Sogou debuted a lip-reading program that can operate at up to 90% accuracy.

=== Partnership with Microsoft Bing ===
In May 2016, Sogou partnered with Microsoft to use Bing to search for English results, and then get the result translated back into Chinese.

=== Partnership with Tsinghua University ===
In 2016, Sogou donated $30 million to Tsinghua University in a joint partnership to build an Artificial Intelligence Institute. It currently supports the Sogou Search Engine Technology Joint Laboratory at Tsinghua University. Located on the edge of the campus of Tsinghua University, Sogou recruits and partners to train students in China.

According to the prospectus, Sogou owns 100% of Chengdu Easypay, a financial technology company specializing in micro loans. As of April 2018, Sogou is still awaiting government approval to operate within China. According to the company address, it is located on the 13th floor of Tencent's building in Chengdu in the 'High-tech zone'.

=== Partnership with Tobii Dynavox ===
In 2022, Sogou partners with Tobii Dynavox to sell devices which aid in communication to people with disabilities in China.

=== Partnership with Xinhua News Agency ===
In 2018, Sogou partnered with Xinhua News Agency to launch an artificial intelligence-generated news anchor.

== Investments ==
=== Typany ===
In 2018, Sogou has expanded the global presence of their other keyboard app, Typany, of which they own 100% of the company. To date, the app works in over 100 languages. The app focuses on the voice recognition and language recognition market.

=== Zhihu.com ===
Along with Tencent, Sogou participated in rounds C and D on Zhihu.com. According to Sogou's IPO prospectus, their investment in Round C in 2015 was 4.8% of Zhihu. The Round D funding contribution was undisclosed, but valued Zhihu at $900 million.

In 2014, Sogou launched Zhihu search and is also the default search engine on Zhihu.

=== Snack Videos ===
In August 2018, Sogou led seed funding for Snack Videos (SnackV.com). Based in Seattle, Snack is an AI-driven mobile learning app designed for short-form videos.

== See also ==
- List of search engines
- Search engine
- Comparison of search engines
