= World Artificial Intelligence Conference =

Annual international AI conference in Shanghai, China

World Artificial Intelligence Conference 世界人工智能大会
- Status: Active
- Location: Shanghai
- Country: China
- Inaugurated: 2018
- Most recent: July 2026
- Attendance: 300,000 (2024)
- Website: worldaic.com.cn

World Artificial Intelligence Conference
- Simplified Chinese: 世界人工智能大会
Transcriptions
Standard Mandarin
- Hanyu Pinyin: Shìjiè Réngōng Zhìnéng Dàhuì

The World Artificial Intelligence Conference (WAIC) is an annual international conference on artificial intelligence (AI) held every July in Shanghai, China. First held in 2018, it is jointly hosted by the Chinese central government departments, the Chinese Academy of Sciences, the China Association for Science and Technology, and the Shanghai Municipal People's Government.

The event combines plenary meetings and specialized forums with exhibitions, competitions, technology demonstrations and industry-related activities. Participants have included government officials, researchers, representatives of international organizations, technology companies, and investors. Since 2024, organizers have used the expanded English title World AI Conference and High-Level Meeting on Global AI Governance.

== History ==
The first WAIC was held in Shanghai in 2018. The United Nations Industrial Development Organization (UNIDO) participated as an international institutional partner and subsequently continued to support the conference.

At the opening of the 2019 conference, Elon Musk and Jack Ma held a public discussion about artificial intelligence, automation and space exploration. Reuters described the appearance as part of the opening programme of the annual conference.

Because of the COVID-19 pandemic, the 2020 edition was held mainly online from 9 to 11 July. Its programme included livestreamed sessions and a three-dimensional virtual exhibition platform.

The 2023 conference was held from 6 to 8 July at the Shanghai World Expo Center and the Shanghai World Expo Exhibition and Convention Center, with additional venues in other parts of the city. Its programme included two plenary sessions, thematic forums and forums organized by companies and other participating institutions. During the conference, UNIDO launched the Global Alliance on Artificial Intelligence for Industry and Manufacturing, known as AIM-Global.

In 2024, the event was held together with a High-Level Meeting on Global AI Governance under the theme "Governing AI for Good and for All". The meeting issued the Shanghai Declaration on Global AI Governance, which set out general positions on AI development, safety, ethics, data governance, employment and international cooperation.

The 2025 edition was held under the theme "Global Solidarity in the AI Era". Its programme was divided into forums, exhibitions, competitions and awards, interactive experiences and innovation-incubation activities. At its opening, Chinese premier Li Qiang proposed the establishment of an international organization for cooperation on AI development and governance. The Chinese government also released an action plan on global AI governance. The proposal was made amid wider technological and regulatory competition between China and the United States.

In 2026, the event was attended by Chinese leader Xi Jinping. On 16 July 2026, 29 countries signed the agreement on the creation of the World Artificial Intelligence Cooperation Organization, with the signing ceremony happening on the eve of the conference.

== Programme and exhibition ==
WAIC includes policy and technical discussions alongside a commercial and technology exhibition. Topics addressed at different editions have included machine learning, large language models, autonomous vehicles, robotics, AI chips, industrial applications and AI governance.

Companies also use the exhibition to demonstrate or announce products. Reuters reported that the 2024 exhibition had a predominantly Chinese group of exhibitors, with foreign companies including Tesla and Qualcomm. In 2025, participating foreign companies included Tesla, Alphabet, and Amazon, alongside Chinese technology companies and robotics firms.

== AI governance initiatives ==
Global AI governance became a more prominent part of the conference after the addition of the High-Level Meeting on Global AI Governance to the conference programme in 2024. The Shanghai Declaration on Global AI Governance (人工智能全球治理上海宣言) issued that year advocated international cooperation while addressing questions including system safety, fairness, access to infrastructure, data security and the effects of AI on employment.

With the signatures of the governments of 29 countries, the World Artificial Intelligence Cooperation Organization was officially established in Shanghai on 16 July 2026, the eve of the WAIC 2026 session.

== See also ==
- Artificial intelligence industry in China
- Regulation of artificial intelligence
- World Internet Conference
