= Inkling =

Inkling may refer to:

- Inkling (company), an American educational technology company
- The Inkling, a 2000 album by Nels Cline
- Inkling (Splatoon), a species from the Splatoon video game series
- The Inklings, an Oxford literary discussion group
- Wacom Inkling, a digital sketch pen
- Inkling, a large language model developed by Thinking Machines Lab
- Inklings, a magazine published by the Museum of Cartoon Art from 1975 to 1978
