= Kimi (AI) =

Artificial intelligence chatbot by Moonshot AI

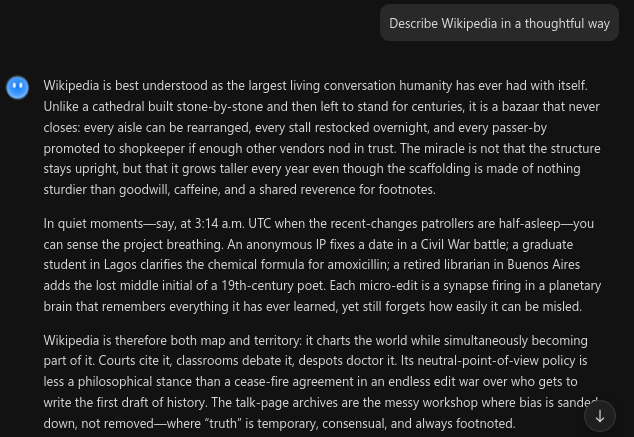
- Screenshot Screenshot of an example of a Kimi K2 answer describing Wikipedia
- Developer: Moonshot AI
- Release: October 2023; 3 years ago
- Stable release: Kimi K3.1 Pro/ 23 October 2026; 24 days ago
- Platform: Web application; iOS; Android
- Type: Chatbot; Large language model
- License: Various; see § Model versions
- Website: kimi.com (mainland China); kimi.ai (international)

Kimi is an artificial intelligence (AI) chatbot and series of large language models developed by Chinese company Moonshot AI. Its Kimi K3, released July 2026, is the largest open weights model at 2.8 trillion parameters.

Moonshot releases the Kimi series of open weights large language models, available via web, API, and the Kimi Code command-line agent. Kimi models can process image and video input in addition to text, and their "Swarm" feature uses hundreds of parallel sub-agents.

Despite its open weights, K3's custom license requires revenue sharing of up to 30% for inference providers generating over US$20 million annually.

Kimi K2, a one-trillion parameter model, was released July 2025. It was followed by K2.5 in January 2026, and K2.6 in April. Kimi models have been used as the basis or for post-training of US models, including Thinking Machines Lab's Inkling and Cursor's Composer 2. In September 2026, Anthropic accused Moonshot of covertly routing Kimi requests to its Claude models and distilling Claude via these responses.

== History ==
Moonshot AI was founded in March 2023 in China. In October 2023, the company officially released the Kimi chatbot and began closed-beta testing.

In July 2024, Kimi's "context caching" feature entered public beta.

On 11 October 2024, Kimi Explore Edition, featuring AI-powered autonomous search, went live globally; monthly active users have since exceeded 36 million.

In September 2025, Moonshot AI added an agentic AI feature to Kimi known as "OK Computer". It is capable of creating multi-page websites and editable slides from simple user prompts and can process up to 1 million rows of input data at once, and output text, audio, images, and video.

In August 2026, legal startup Harvey unveiled its new model using Kimi.

== Models ==
On 16 November 2023, Kimi was released to the general public based on the Moonshot model. The first version of Kimi supported lossless context of 128,000 tokens, making it the first AI model that was capable of accepting contexts of this size.

In March 2024, Moonshot AI began closed beta testing of an updated version of Kimi with a 2 million character context window.

In November 2024, Kimi began internal testing of an AI video generation model.

On 20 January 2025, Kimi K1.5 was released. Moonshot AI claimed it matched the performance of OpenAI o1 in mathematics, coding, and multimodal reasoning capabilities.

In April 2025, the company released Kimi-VL, an open source 16 billion parameter mixture of experts (MoE) large language model with 3 billion active parameters. In June, a reasoning model named Kimi-VL-Thinking was also released.

In June 2025, Kimi-Dev, a 72B parameter coding-focused model based on Qwen2.5-72B, was released. Also in June, Moonshot AI released Kimi-Researcher, an autonomous AI research agent available through Kimi's website and app.

In July 2025, Moonshot AI released Kimi K2, a 1 trillion parameter model with 32 billion active parameters which was open sourced under a modified MIT license. On 9 September 2025, Moonshot AI released an updated version of K2, Kimi-K2-Instruct-0905, which improved its performance in coding tasks and increased its context window from 128K tokens to 256K tokens.

In January 2026, Moonshot AI released Kimi K2.5, a 1 trillion parameter MoE model with 32 billion active parameters. The model is multimodal in vision and language understanding with advanced agentic capabilities, instant and thinking modes, as well as conversational and agentic paradigms. Moonshot AI released Kimi K2.6 in April 2026, followed by Kimi K2.7 Code in June 2026.

Moonshot AI released its Kimi K3 model, on 16 July 2026, with 2.8 trillion parameters. Upon release, Kimi K3 debuted at No. 3 on the Artificial Analysis AI leaderboard, behind Anthropic's Claude Fable 5 and OpenAI's GPT-5.6 Sol, but outperformed its competitors on Arena.ai's front-end web development benchmark. Moonshot AI released the weights for Kimi K3 on July 27 under a custom license that requires any company with annual revenue greater than US$20 million to negotiate a contract with Moonshot AI before providing Kimi K3 to external customers as a service, and any company with either monthly revenue greater than $20 million or over 100 million monthly active users to display attribution of Kimi K3 in any product that incorporates the model. Moonshot has faced accusations, including from Michael Kratsios, director of the White House Office of Science and Technology Policy, that Kimi K3 was made by distilling Anthropic's Claude Fable model.

In October 2026, Kimi K3.1 Pro was released, an AI upgrade for financial research, 3D modeling and coding.

Kimi models have been used as the basis or for post-training of US models, including Thinking Machines Lab's Inkling, and Cursor's Composer 2.

=== Model versions ===
Main model versions of Kimi with descriptions
Version	Release date	Description	License	Ref.
K2 Thinking	November 2025	Reasoning model	Modified MIT	
K2.5	January 2026		Modified MIT	
K2.6	April 2026	A general-purpose multimodal model with support for text, image, and video inputs. Intended for dialogue and agentic tasks. It is reported to provide stronger long-context code generation, improved reasoning, and better self-correction. It supports a 256K context window.	Modified MIT	
K2.7 Code	June 2026	A specialized coding model. This model is positioned for software development, reasoning, and agentic workflows. It offers a 256K context window and supports multi-step tool invocation. This model does not support non-thinking mode.	Modified MIT	
K3	July 2026	A flagship mixture-of-experts (MoE) large language model with 2.8 trillion parameters. It uses a sparse MoE setup with 896 experts, of which 16 are active per input. This model is built on Kimi Delta Attention and Attention Residuals. It includes native visual understanding and a 1-million-token context window. It is designed for long-horizon coding, knowledge work, and reasoning tasks.	Kimi K3	

=== Techniques ===
==== Attention Residuals ====
Attention Residuals is an attention mechanism over the residual stream. Consider a neural network with layers 1, 2, 3, .... Let the input of layer i be $h_i$, and let its output be $h_i'$. We also write $h_0' := h_1$ to make the notation cleaner.

In non-residual neural networks, $h_i = h_{i-1}'$. In residual neural networks, $h_i = h_0' + h_1' + \dots + h_{i-1}'$. In Attention Residuals, we use the standard dot-product attention:
$$h_i = \operatorname{SoftmaxAttention}(q_i, K_i, V_i), \quad K_i = V_i = [h_0', h_1', \dots, h_{i-1}']$$
where the vectors $q_1, q_2, \dots$ are learnable parameters, one for each layer. This is similar to the idea of learnable positional encoding vectors.

In practice, the Kimi K3 paper used a variant called Blocked Attention Residuals, that they claimed preserved essentially all the benefits of Attention Residuals while saving memory. The layers are partitioned into consecutive blocks, each containing $n_1, n_2, \dots$ layers. Let $(n, i)$ denote the i-th layer in the n-th block, then
$$\begin{aligned}
h_{(m,i)} &=
\operatorname{SoftmaxAttention}
(q_{(m,i)}, K_{(m,i)}, V_{(m,i)}), \\
K_{(m,i)} = V_{(m,i)} &=
\begin{cases}
\left[\sum_{j=1}^{n_1} h_{(1,j)}',
\sum_{j=1}^{n_2} h_{(2,j)}',
\dots,
\sum_{j=1}^{n_{m-1}} h_{(m-1,j)}'\right]
& \text{if } i=1, \\
\left[\sum_{j=1}^{n_1} h_{(1,j)}',
\sum_{j=1}^{n_2} h_{(2,j)}',
\dots,
\sum_{j=1}^{n_{m-1}} h_{(m-1,j)}', \sum_{j=1}^{i-1} h_{(m,j)}'\right]
& \text{if } i\geq 2.
\end{cases}
\end{aligned}$$

==== Others ====
Stable LatentMoE is a variant of LatentMoE adapted to Kimi K3, which uses 896 routed experts with 16 active experts per token, corresponding to a sparsity of 56. This makes normal LatentMoE unstable, and their variant makes it stable again.

Kimi K3 uses Sigmoid Tanh Unit GLU (SiTU-GLU) as its feedforward modules. In a SwiGLU feedforward module,
$$\operatorname{FFN}_\operatorname{SwiGLU}(x) =
(x W \odot \sigma(\beta x W) \odot xV)W'$$
where $W, W', V$ are learnable matrices. Kimi K3 replaces both linear maps by tanh:
$$\operatorname{FFN}_\operatorname{SiTU\text{-}GLU}(x) =
(4\tanh(xW/4) \odot \sigma(x W) \odot 25\tanh(xV/25))W'$$

== See also ==
- Reasoning model – Large language model designed for reasoning tasks
- List of chatbots
- List of AI-assisted software development tools
