= Mira Murati =

Albanian-American business executive

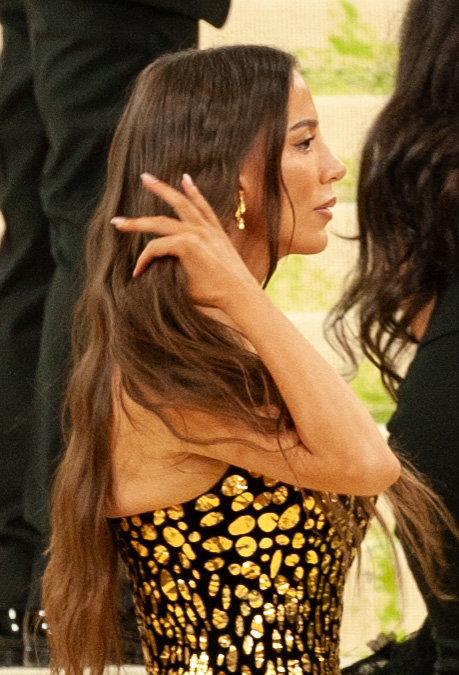
- Murati at the 2026 Met Gala
- Born: 16 December 1988 (age 37); Vlorë, People's Socialist Republic of Albania
- Education: Colby College (BA); Dartmouth College (BEng)
- Employers: Tesla (2013–2016); Leap Motion (2016–2018); OpenAI (2018–2024); Thinking Machines Lab (2024–present)

Ermira "Mira" Murati (born 16 December 1988) is an Albanian-American business executive. She is a co-founder and chief executive of Thinking Machines Lab, an artificial intelligence company she launched in February 2025. She served as chief technology officer of OpenAI from May 2022 to September 2024 and, for three days in November 2023, as the company's interim chief executive during the brief removal of Sam Altman. She previously worked as a product manager at Tesla and led product and engineering at Leap Motion.

== Early life and education ==
Murati was born on 16 December 1988 in Vlorë, Albania. She is fluent in English and Italian. At age 16, she attended Pearson College UWC on Vancouver Island in Canada for high school on the Davis United World College Scholars Program, from which she graduated in 2007 with an International Baccalaureate diploma.

After high school, Murati studied at a dual-degree undergraduate program, receiving a Bachelor of Arts degree from Colby College in 2011 and a Bachelor of Engineering degree in mechanical engineering from Dartmouth College in 2012.

== Career ==
=== Early career ===
Murati interned in 2011 as a summer analyst at Goldman Sachs in Tokyo, Japan. She then briefly worked for Zodiac Aerospace as an intern before joining the electric car company Tesla in 2013 as a product manager on the Model X. From 2016 to 2018, she worked for the augmented reality start-up Leap Motion (now Ultraleap).

=== OpenAI ===
In 2018, she joined OpenAI as vice president of applied AI and partnerships. She became chief technology officer (CTO) in May 2022. She led OpenAI's work on ChatGPT, DALL-E, Codex and Sora, while overseeing its research, product and safety teams. Murati worked on several of OpenAI's notable products, such as the Generative Pretrained Transformer (GPT) series of language models. During a June 2024 discussion at Dartmouth College's Thayer School of Engineering, Murati said some creative jobs may disappear, qualifying that such roles were questionable where the resulting content was of low quality. The remark drew criticism from writers and artists, including Dartmouth students. In October 2023, Murati was ranked 57th on Fortune's list of "The 100 Most Powerful Women in Business of 2023".

In November 2023, Murati became the interim chief executive officer of OpenAI following the removal of Sam Altman from the job. She had collaborated with Ilya Sutskever, whose 52-page memo outlining concerns about Altman relied heavily on screenshots and information she provided, which contributed to the board's decision to oust him. Murati was replaced by Emmett Shear three days later, who left when Altman was reinstated five days later. Following these events, Murati returned to her role as CTO. In June 2024, Dartmouth College awarded Murati an honorary Doctor of Science.

In September 2024, Murati announced that she was stepping down as CTO to allow her the opportunity to "do my own exploration". This move came amid a wider executive exodus as OpenAI chief research officer Bob McGrew and a vice president of research, Barret Zoph, also announced their departures soon after.

=== Thinking Machines Lab ===
In February 2025, Murati launched Thinking Machines Lab, a new public benefit corporation aiming "to make AI systems more widely understood, customizable, and generally capable". She was reported to have hired "a team of about 30 leading researchers and engineers from competitors including Meta, Mistral, and OpenAI." People involved with the startup include OpenAI co-founder John Schulman, and advisors Alec Radford and Bob McGrew. The following month, Bloomberg reported that the company had reached an estimated valuation of $9 billion, with an "average founder stake value" of $1.4 billion.

In April 2025, Thinking Machines Lab reportedly aimed for a $2 billion seed round (requiring a minimum investment of $50 million). The round was led by Andreessen Horowitz and included participation from the government of Albania, valuing the company at $12 billion.

Thinking Machines Lab follows a governance structure wherein Mira Murati holds a deciding vote on board matters, weighted to provide her with a majority decision-making capability.

In October 2025, Thinking Machines Lab announced its first product, Tinker, a tool used to create custom frontier AI models.

== Publications ==
- Murati, Ermira (Spring 2022). "Language & Coding Creativity". Daedalus. 151 (2). Cambridge, MA: American Academy of Arts and Sciences (AAAS): 156–167. doi:10.1162/daed_a_01907.
