= Suchir Balaji =

American AI researcher (1998–2024)

- Born: November 21, 1998; Florida, U.S.
- Died: November 26, 2024 (aged 26); San Francisco, California, U.S.
- Education: University of California, Berkeley (BA)
- Occupations: Artificial intelligence researcher; IT professional; software engineer
- Employer: OpenAI (2020–24)
- Known for: Work on WebGPT and public criticism of AI training practices at OpenAI
- Website: suchir.net

Suchir Balaji (November 21, 1998 – November 26, 2024) was an American artificial intelligence researcher who was found dead one month after accusing OpenAI, his former employer, of violating United States copyright law. His death drew widespread attention because of his purported whistleblower status and claims of foul play made by his parents and others. The San Francisco Police Department investigation, however, found "no evidence of foul play", and the Chief Medical Examiner concluded the death was a suicide.

== Early life and education ==
Balaji was born in Florida on November 21, 1998, into an Indian-American family. He grew up in Cupertino, California, where both of his parents worked in the technology sector. He started coding with the children's educational tool Scratch at the age of 11, had built his own computer at the age of 13, and wrote a paper about chip design at the age of 14.

Balaji attended Monta Vista High School and was a finalist for the 2015–16 season of the US Computing Olympiad. In 2017, he ranked seventh place in a Kaggle "Passenger Screening Algorithm Challenge" sponsored by the US Transportation Security Administration (TSA), for which he earned $100,000. In 2017, he also won first place in the Pacific Northwest Regional Programming Contest and the Berkeley Programming Contest. In 2018, he placed 31st in the World Finals of the International Collegiate Programming Contest of the Association for Computing Machinery.

Balaji took a gap year after high school to work as a software developer at Quora. He then attended the University of California, Berkeley and interned at Scale AI in 2019, and graduated with a BA in computer science. After graduating in 2021, he joined OpenAI full-time.

== Career ==
John Schulman, a cofounder of OpenAI, recruited Balaji right out of college. Balaji spent nearly four years working at the company as an artificial intelligence researcher. Among other projects, he was involved in gathering and organizing the internet data used to train GPT-4, a language model used by the company's online chatbot, ChatGPT. He also worked on a precursor model called WebGPT. Writing in an online eulogy, Schulman claimed that "Suchir's contributions to this project were essential, and it wouldn’t have succeeded without him."

Balaji left OpenAI in August 2024 after becoming disillusioned with its business practices, saying "If you believe what I believe, you have to just leave the company." After leaving, he said he had been working on "personal projects". According to one interview with his mother along with documents shared by his advisors, he planned to create a nonprofit centered around machine learning and neuroscience that would serve as a direct competitor to OpenAI. While people around him told him to be careful going against his former employer, he remained steadfast in his mission, and worked on getting venture capitalists interested in his project.

== New York Times article ==
In an October 23, 2024 New York Times interview, Balaji alleged that products like ChatGPT violate United States copyright law because they are trained on the products of business competitors, and because the chatbots' outputs can then imitate and substitute those products. He said that ChatGPT and similar chatbots are ruining the commercial viability of the individuals and organizations who produced the data that the AI systems are trained on.

The New York Times piece contains a summary of Balaji's essay "When does generative AI qualify for fair use?", published on his personal website earlier that week. In the essay, he mathematically analyzed the outputs of chatbots such as ChatGPT, and argued that they fail the four-factor test for determining fair use under U.S. copyright law. He further suggests that the argument could be applied to other generative AI products as well.

At the time, OpenAI was being sued for copyright infringement by prominent authors and news publishers, including The New York Times. In a November 18, 2024 court filing, Balaji was identified by the New York Times' attorneys as one of a number of people who might have "relevant documents" in the copyright case against OpenAI. Several of the people named in the news service's court filings as potentially having relevant documents were former or current OpenAI employees. Balaji had said that he would testify against OpenAI. Unlike other OpenAI whistleblowers, Balaji did not reveal any new information about the company.

The New York Times article cites Stanford University law professor Mark Lemley, who disagreed that generative AI services violate copyright law, and intellectual property attorney Bradley Hulbert, who said a new law might be necessary to settle the question of legality. Months after Balaji's death, which attracted significant public attention, Hulbert told Fortune magazine that Balaji's essay "[reads like] the argument of a really smart non-lawyer who read up on the subject but does not have a thorough understanding". Another intellectual property attorney, quoted anonymously by Fortune due to concerns about conspiracy theories surrounding Balaji's death, said Balaji's analysis "misunderstands the law in some fundamental ways".

OpenAI argued that its software was "grounded in fair use and related international copyright principles that are fair for creators and support innovation", and was "trained on publicly available data".

== Death ==
Balaji's parents say they last heard from their son on November 22, 2024. After he stopped responding to text messages, they asked San Francisco police to enter his home to conduct a well-being check. On November 26, 2024, the police found Balaji dead in his apartment from a single gunshot wound to the head. He was 26 years old. The gun that was found at the scene was purchased in January 2024 and registered in Balaji's name.

A San Francisco Office of the Chief Medical Examiner (OCME) autopsy report was released on February 14, 2025, stating that Balaji died of a single, self-inflicted gunshot wound on the day that the police found him. The police noted that the only entrance to the apartment was dead-bolted from the inside, and that Balaji had recently researched brain anatomy on his computer. Toxicology results showed he had alcohol, amphetamine and GHB in his system at the time of his death. (Note: The San Francisco Standard states that his blood alcohol concentration was more than twice the legal limit for driving and that he also had "significant levels of GHB [...] in his system".)

Balaji's death attracted public and media interest due to his purported whistleblower status as a "custodial witness" in The New York Times's lawsuit against OpenAI, and his claims that OpenAI violated AI copyright laws and maintained poor AI ethics standards. The news coverage also drew attention to his original essay outlining his legal arguments against OpenAI.

=== Skepticism and calls for further investigation ===
Despite the preliminary statements from San Francisco authorities describing the death as a suicide, the circumstances of the death and an initial lack of detailed information from authorities led to widespread speculation and conspiracy theories suggesting Balaji had been deliberately silenced before he could testify against OpenAI.

Prior to the official autopsy report being released in February 2025, doubts were raised by Balaji's parents about the cause of his death. They campaigned publicly to raise awareness of what they claimed was an inaccurate verdict from San Francisco authorities. Among other factors for their claim, they described Balaji's mood as "cheerful" about two weeks prior to his death and the "lack of a suicide note [as well as] blood spatter anomalies" in his apartment. His parents announced in December 2024 that they had hired private investigators and had a second autopsy performed. They said that this showed evidence of homicide, claiming that Balaji was shot "in the back of the head from an angle at which he could not have shot himself", although they did not provide a copy of the autopsy and their lawyer said he "would not characterize it as conclusively proving murder". The official autopsy released by the OCME describes a front-to-back and downward bullet travel path.

Claims of foul play gained momentum after Elon Musk, who has publicly feuded with OpenAI CEO Sam Altman, stated in December 2024 that the death "doesn't seem like a suicide" in response to a tweet by Balaji's mother. In January 2025, Tucker Carlson discussed the death with Balaji's mother on his podcast. On the same day, Congressman Ro Khanna called for a "full and transparent investigation" into the cause of death. San Francisco Supervisor Jackie Fielder said she was "concerned" about the circumstances of Balaji's death.

In an article prior to the release of the official autopsy, Fortune attributed the parents' actions to a sincere desire to understand what has happened to their only son. The magazine interviewed several of Balaji's friends, who shared the parents' confusion and grief. The article cited Daren Firestone, an "attorney who works regularly with whistleblowers", who said whistleblowers often experience loneliness and doubt, can be under "enormous pressure", and may come to feel the "world is against [them]". Fortune also emphasized that "Balaji wasn’t divulging any previously unknown inside information about the company". Fortune and The Nation compared the controversy to the John Barnett case, and stated that the parents' actions had fueled speculation on the internet.

=== Official position ===
As of April 2025, the conclusion of the San Francisco Police Department and the San Francisco Office of the Chief Medical Examiner is that Balaji shot himself.

== See also ==
- List of conspiracy theories
- List of suicides (possible or disputed)
- List of whistleblowers (2020s)
