= Alec Radford =

American AI researcher (born 1993)

- Born: April 1993 (age 33); Dallas–Fort Worth metroplex, Texas, U.S.
- Education: Olin College (attended, did not graduate)
- Known for: GPT; Whisper; DALL-E; Talkie (language model)
- Scientific career
- Fields: Artificial intelligence, natural language processing
- Workplaces: Indico; OpenAI; Thinking Machines Lab

Alec Radford (born April 1993) is an American artificial intelligence researcher. He worked at OpenAI from 2016 to 2024.

== Early life and education ==
Radford was born in April 1993 and grew up in the Dallas–Fort Worth metroplex in Texas. He graduated from Cistercian Preparatory School in 2011, where he became an Eagle Scout, and dropped out of Olin College in August 2014.

== Career ==
While studying at Olin College, Radford and fellow students Slater Victoroff, Diana Yuan, and Madison May had formed the startup Indico in their dorm room. In 2015, the group was joined by Luke Metz and the firm and the Facebook AI research lab in New York used generative adversarial networks to create realistic low pixel images. A demonstration of Indico's technology was used without proper attribution in an April 2016 demonstration by Nvidia chief executive Jensen Huang.

Radford joined OpenAI around 2016, where he worked on natural-language processing. The following year, Radford trained a neural network on Amazon reviews. The model was basic, with layers that allowed for human understanding. Upon exploring it, he saw that it had a special neuron linked to the sentiment of the reviews, which it had created on its own. This was an improvement from previous neural networks that had analysed sentiment, because they had to be told to do so and specially trained on data that was explicitly labeled according to sentiment. This development made OpenAI chief scientist Ilya Sutskever consider that a future model, using more diverse language data, could map far more structures of meaning, eventually becoming a "learned core module" for superintelligence.

In 2018, Radford served as the lead author on OpenAI's research paper on generative pre-trained transformers, which form the foundation of ChatGPT. In addition to early GPT models, his work at OpenAI included Whisper, a speech recognition model, and the image generator DALL-E. He left OpenAI in December 2024 to pursue independent research. Around March 2025, Radford joined Thinking Machines Lab as an advisor. He joined along with Bob McGrew who was previously the chief research officer of OpenAI.

In April 2026, Radford, Nick Levine, and David Duvenaud released Talkie, an AI model trained on books, newspapers, scientific journals, patents, and case law published before December 31, 1930. The model was built solely with Public Domain training data, with the purpose of exploring whether models can forecast future events. When asked about the state of the world in 2026, it stated that one billion people would live in Europe, that London and New York would be connected by steamships that transit between the two in ten days, and "winter will be passed in Paris, and the summer in London."
