= Andrej Karpathy =

Czechoslovak-born AI researcher (born 1986)

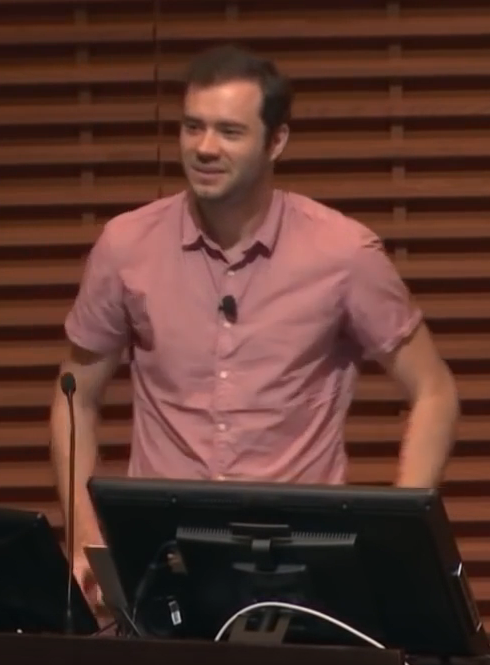
- Karpathy at Stanford in 2019
- Born: Andrej Karpathy; October 23, 1986 (age 40); Bratislava, Czechoslovakia (now Slovakia)
- Education: University of Toronto (BSc); University of British Columbia (MSc); Stanford University (PhD)
- Awards: Innovators Under 35 (2020); TIME100 Most Influential People in AI (2024)
- Scientific career
- Fields: Machine learning Computer vision Artificial intelligence
- Workplaces: OpenAI (2015–2017, 2023–2024); Tesla, Inc. (2017–2022); Eureka Labs (2024–2026); Anthropic (2026–present)
- Thesis: Connecting Images and Natural Language (2016)
- Doctoral advisor: Fei-Fei Li
- Website: karpathy.ai

Andrej Karpathy (born 23 October 1986) is a Slovak-Canadian AI researcher, who co-founded and formerly worked at OpenAI, where he specialized in deep learning and computer vision. He also worked as the director of artificial intelligence and Autopilot Vision at Tesla, and in 2024 he founded Eureka Labs, an AI education platform. In 2026 he joined Anthropic as part of the pretraining team.

== Education and early life ==
Karpathy was born in Bratislava, Czechoslovakia (now Slovakia), and moved with his family to Toronto when he was 15. He completed his Computer Science and Physics bachelor's degrees at the University of Toronto in 2009 and his master's degree at the University of British Columbia in 2011, where he worked on physically simulated figures.

In 2006, Karpathy began posting videos on YouTube on his channel, badmephisto. He became known for Rubik's Cube tutorials; speedcuber Feliks Zemdegs has said he learned from them.

Karpathy received a PhD from Stanford University in 2015 under the supervision of Fei-Fei Li, focusing on the intersection of natural language processing and computer vision, and deep learning models suited for this task.

== Career and research ==
He authored and was the primary instructor of the first deep learning course at Stanford, CS 231n: Convolutional Neural Networks for Visual Recognition. The course became one of the largest classes at Stanford, growing from 150 students in 2015 to 750 in 2017.

Karpathy is a founding member of the artificial intelligence research group OpenAI, where he was a research scientist from 2015 to 2017. In June 2017 he became Tesla's director of artificial intelligence and reported to Elon Musk. He was named one of MIT Technology Review's Innovators Under 35 for 2020. After taking a several-months-long sabbatical from Tesla, he announced he was leaving the company in July 2022. As of February 2023, he makes YouTube videos on how to create artificial neural networks.

On February 9, 2023, Karpathy announced he was returning to OpenAI. A year later on February 13, 2024, an OpenAI spokesperson confirmed that Karpathy had left OpenAI. In the same year, he was named one of Time Magazine's 100 Most Influential People in AI. On July 16, 2024, Karpathy announced on his X.com account that he started a new AI education company called Eureka Labs. Their first product was the AI course, LLM101n. He also has a broader educational effort, the "Zero to Hero" series on LLM fundamentals. The company also advocates for AI teaching assistants, a concept which has been criticized due to data privacy concerns and the removal of personal connection between teacher and student.

In February 2025, Karpathy coined the term vibe coding to describe how AI tools allow hobbyists to construct apps and websites just by typing prompts. On May 19, 2026, he announced that he joined Anthropic via a statement on X.com, while the company stated that he will be leading a team for research in pretraining.
