= Thinking Machines Lab =

American artificial intelligence company

Thinking Machines Lab Inc.
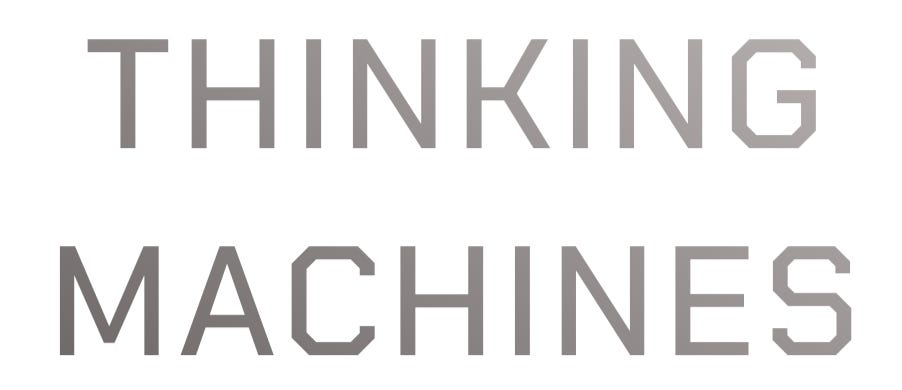

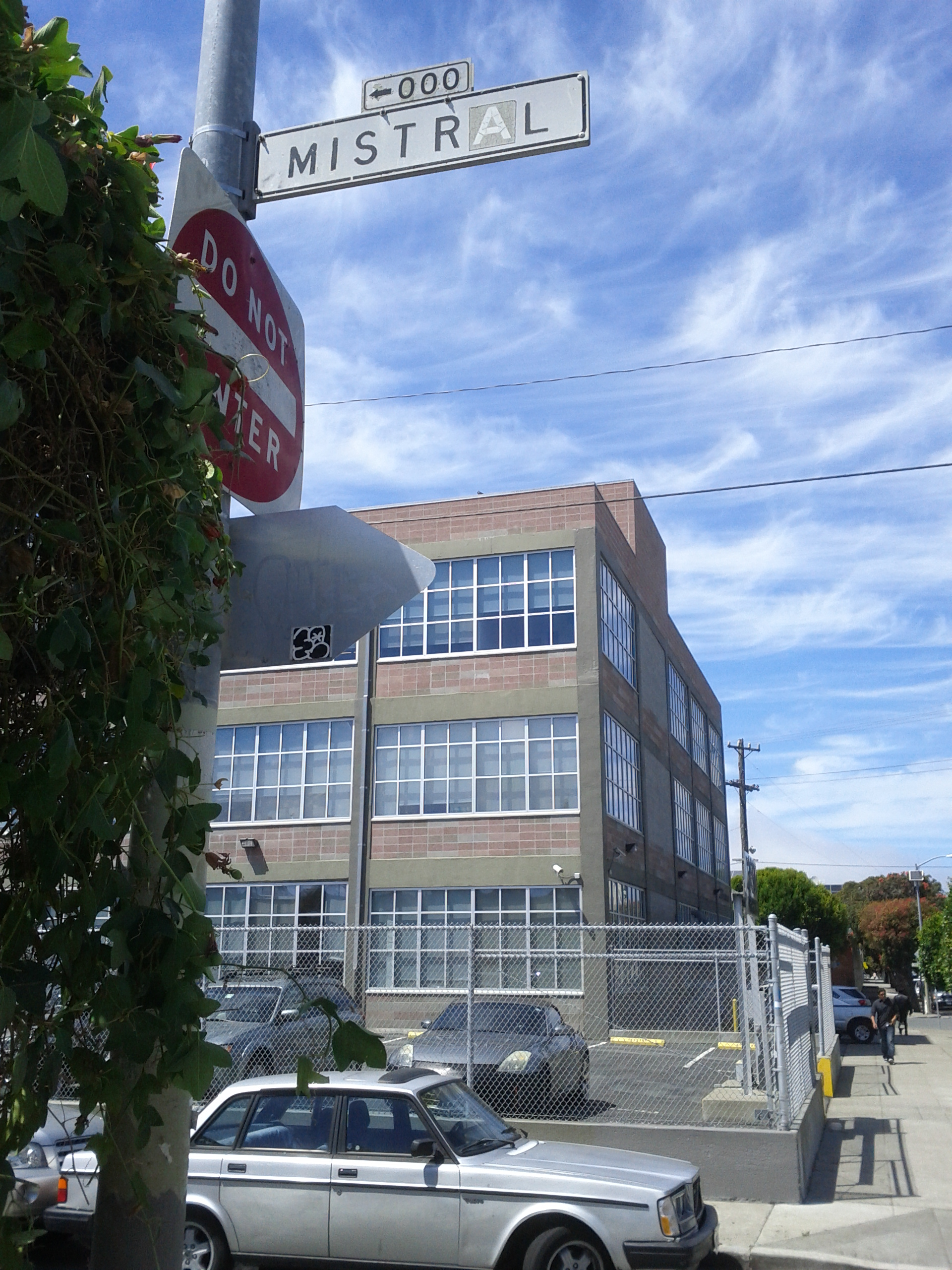
- Headquarters at 2300 Harrison St, Mission District, San Francisco
- Type: Private (Benefit corporation)
- Industry: Artificial intelligence
- Founded: February 2025; 1 year ago in San Francisco, California, US
- Founder: Mira Murati
- Headquarters: 2300 Harrison Street, San Francisco, California, US
- Key people: Mira Murati (CEO); John Schulman (chief scientist)
- Products: AI systems and platforms
- Number of employees: 100 (2026)
- Website: thinkingmachines.ai

Thinking Machines Lab Inc. is an American artificial intelligence (AI) startup founded by Mira Murati, the former chief technology officer of OpenAI. Their flagship model is Inkling, an open weights large language model.

The company was founded in February 2025, and by July had completed an early-stage funding round led by Andreessen Horowitz, raising $2 billion at a valuation of $12 billion overall from investors such as Nvidia, AMD, Cisco, and Jane Street. The company is based in San Francisco and structured as a public benefit corporation.

Inkling released under the Apache License on July 15, 2026, with 975 billion parameters; the company released Inkling Small, a distilled 276-billion parameter model with similar performance, the same month. The model was partially developed using Chinese open weights models DeepSeek-V3 for its foundation and Moonshot AI's Kimi K2.5 for post-training synthetic data. At the time, Inkling was considered the largest and most powerful open weights model released outside of China, exceeding Nvidia's Nemotron 3 Ultra.

Thinking Machines launched Tinker, an API for fine-tuning open weights models, in October 2025. As of August 2026, Tinker supports open models families Inkling, Qwen, and Nemotron, and models DeepSeek-V3.1, GLM-5.3, Kimi K2.6, and gpt-oss.

== History ==
By its launch in February 2025, Thinking Machines Lab was reported to have hired about 30 researchers and engineers from competitors including OpenAI, Meta AI, and Mistral AI. Its founding team members include Barret Zoph, former OpenAI VP of Research (Post-Training), Lilian Weng, former OpenAI VP, OpenAI cofounder John Schulman, who joined after a brief stint at the lab's competitor Anthropic, and Luke Metz, a member of OpenAI's technical staff.

In January 2026, Zoph and Metz departed the startup to return to OpenAI.

Other former OpenAI employees who have been hired include Jonathan Lachman and Andrew Tulloch (although Tulloch departed after getting recruited for Meta Superintelligence Labs). Thinking Machines Lab's advisers include Bob McGrew, previously OpenAI's chief research officer, and Alec Radford, who was a lead researcher for OpenAI.

In March 2026, Thinking Machines Lab announced a strategic partnership with NVIDIA involving an undisclosed investment and a multi-year agreement to deploy one gigawatt of Vera Rubin computing capacity.

In August 2026, the company moved its headquarters to the office building 2300 Harrison St, in San Francisco's Mission District.

== Products ==
On October 1, 2025, Thinking Machines Lab announced Tinker, an API for fine-tuning language models. Users would submit jobs through the API for fine-tuning one of the various open-weight models supported. The Lab would run the jobs on its internal clusters and training infrastructure. As of August 2026, Tinker supports open models families Inkling, Qwen, and Nemotron, and models DeepSeek-V3.1, GLM-5.3, Kimi K2.6, and gpt-oss.

Thinking Machines Lab released its large language model Inkling on July 15, 2026, under the Apache License, with 975 billion parameters. The model drew from Chinese open weights models DeepSeek-V3 for its architecture and Moonshot AI's Kimi K2.5 for post-training synthetic data. Media outlets described Inkling as the leading non-Chinese open-weights model, ahead of Nvidia's Nemotron, Mistral AI's models and, Google DeepMind's Gemma, but noting a lag behind China's open-weights releases by Z.ai, DeepSeek, MiniMax Group, and Xiaomi MiMo.

Inkling Small, a 276-billion parameter model with comparable performance to Inkling, was released by the company on July 31, 2026. Inkling 2 Mini, released in November 2026, rivals much larger models in software engineering and tool-use benchmarks.

== Business structure ==
Thinking Machines Lab grants Mira Murati a deciding vote on board matters, weighted to provide her with a majority decision-making capability. Additionally, founding shareholders possess votes weighted 100 times greater than those of regular shareholders.

In July 2025, Andreessen Horowitz was reported to have led the company's initial funding round, raising "about $2 billion at a valuation of $12 billion". The government of Albania (Murati's country of origin) was also included in this round, making a $10 million investment which required an amendment to the country's 2025 budget.
