= Pioneer Building (San Francisco) =

- Pioneer Trunk Factory--C. A. Malm & Co.
- U.S. National Register of Historic Places
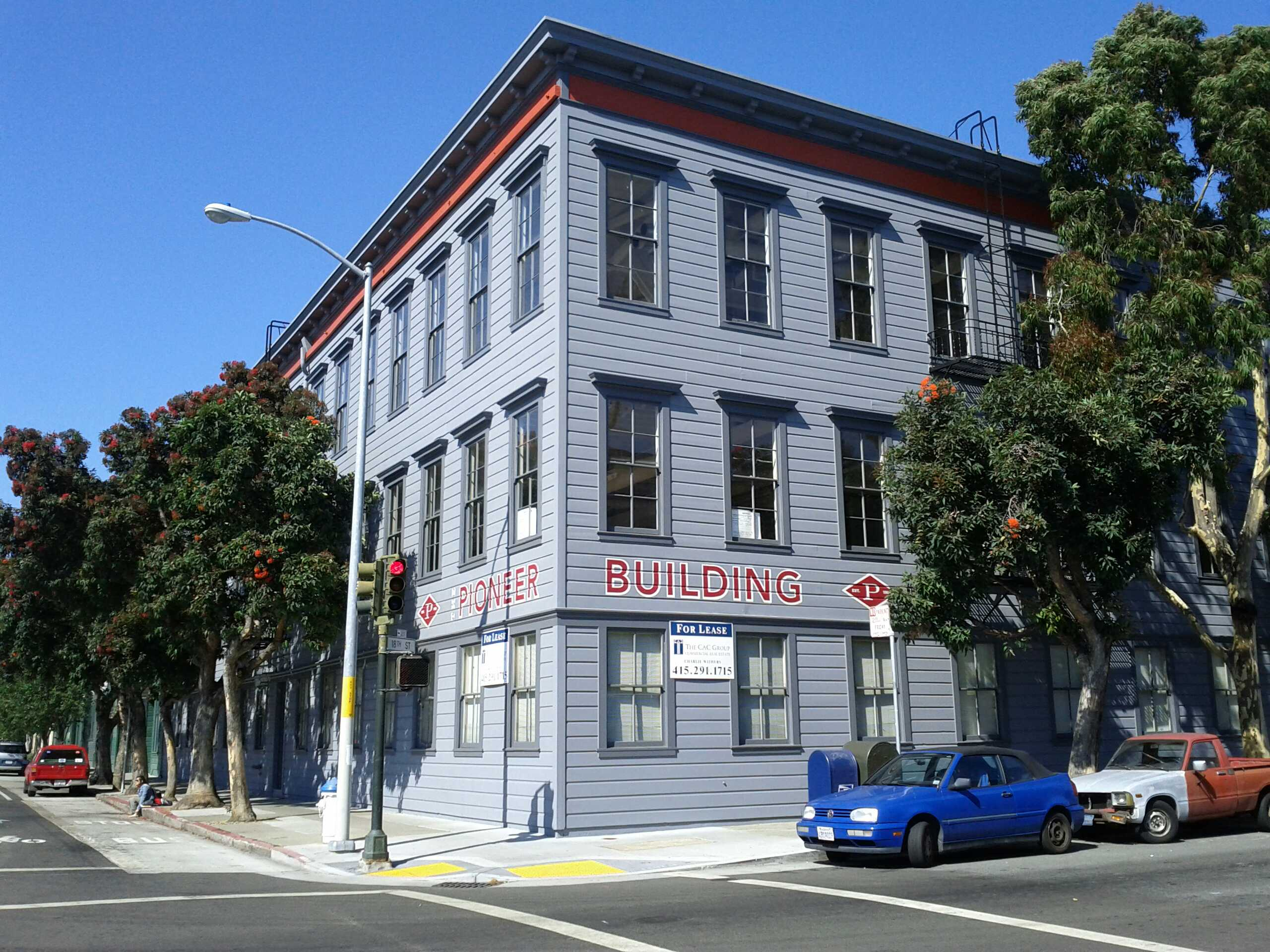
- The Pioneer Building in 2012

- Location within San Francisco County Location within California Location within the United States
- Location: 2185--2199 Folsom and 3180 18th Sts., San Francisco, California
- Coordinates: 37.7623°N 122.4148°W
- Area: 0.4 acres (0.16 ha)
- Built: 1902
- Architects: Welsh, Thomas
- Architectural style: Italianate
- NRHP reference No.: 86003727
- Added to NRHP: March 5, 1987

The Pioneer Building, also known as the Pioneer Trunk Factory - C. A. Malm & Co. building is a historic building in San Francisco, California. The building is located at 2185-2199 Folsom and 3180 18th Streets. It was designed by San Francisco architect Thomas J. Welsh and built in 1902. It was originally two buildings that stood next to each other along 18th street. They were joined into one during rehabilitation in 1985-1986. It was listed on the National Register of Historic Places in 1987, as "Pioneer Trunk Factory--C. A. Malm & Co."

The former factory is located just outside the area destroyed by the 1906 fire, and is one of the few remaining examples (e.g.: Levi Strauss & Co. Factory, 250 Valencia Street) of the kind of large completely wooden structure, ornamented with Italianate architectural detail, that was once characteristic of industrial buildings in the Mission district. Its use of Italiente style wooden details resembles many Victorians built in San Francisco at the time. However, the style is unusual for factory buildings, and was perhaps chosen to better fit with the residential buildings that surround it.

The factory originally manufactured trunks for automobiles, which were sold in two stores in downtown San Francisco (before trunks became a standard part of the car.) In addition to the eponymous factory, the building originally also hosted a corner storefront.

After the factory went out of business in the 1930s, the building was used as a warehouse and a machine shop. In the 21st century, the building once housed the office of Stripe. In 2020, it housed the offices of OpenAI and Neuralink. OpenAI vacated the building in August 2024, and rival xAI moved in during October 2024. In 2024, Elon Musk claimed to own the building.
