= Greg Brockman =

American entrepreneur, investor and software developer (born 1987)

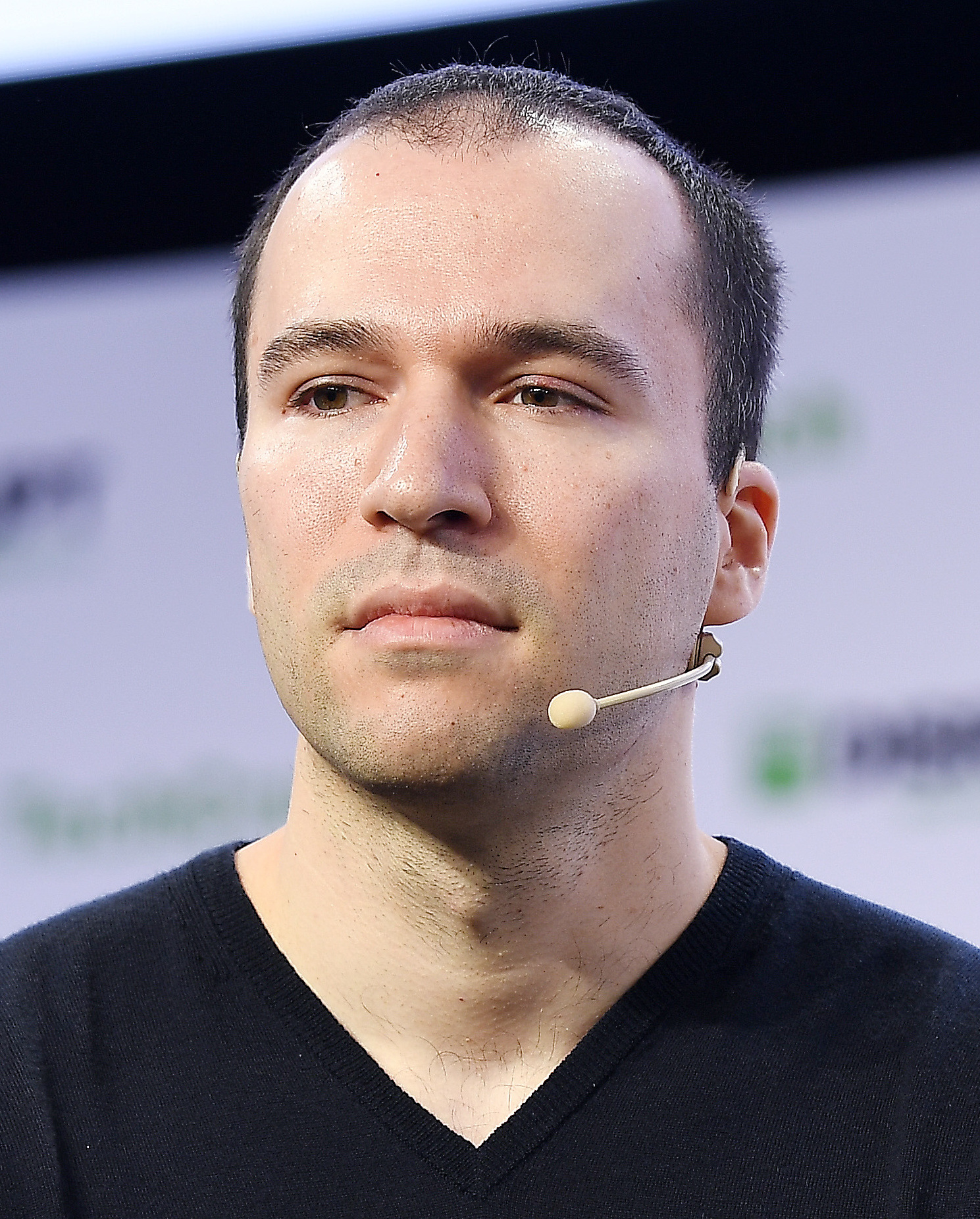
- Brockman in 2019
- Born: November 29, 1987 (age 38); Thompson, North Dakota, U.S.
- Education: Harvard University (transferred); Massachusetts Institute of Technology (dropped out)
- Occupations: Software engineer; entrepreneur
- Known for: President of OpenAI; Former CTO of Stripe and OpenAI
- Spouse: Anna Brockman (m. 2019)
- Website: gregbrockman.com

Gregory Brockman (born November 29, 1987) is an American entrepreneur and software engineer. He is co-founder and president of OpenAI. He began his career at Stripe in 2010, upon leaving MIT, and became CTO in 2013. He left Stripe in 2015 to co-found OpenAI, where he also served as CTO.

== Early life ==
Brockman was born in Thompson, North Dakota, and attended Red River High School, where he excelled in mathematics, chemistry, and computer science. He won a silver medal in the 2006 International Chemistry Olympiad and became the first finalist from North Dakota to participate in the Intel science talent search since 1973. In 2003, 2005, and 2007, he attended Canada/USA Mathcamp, a summer program for mathematically talented high-school students. In 2008, Brockman enrolled at Harvard University but left a year later, briefly enrolling at the Massachusetts Institute of Technology.

== Career ==
In 2010, he dropped out of MIT to join Stripe, a company founded by Patrick Collison, his MIT classmate, and John Collison. In 2013, he became Stripe's first CTO, while the company grew from 5 to 205 employees. Brockman left Stripe in May 2015.

=== OpenAI ===
Brockman met with Sam Altman and Elon Musk, and led the recruiting of the OpenAI founding team. Many of its members, including Ilya Sutskever, were top AI research talent that left high paying jobs for the opportunity at OpenAI. He co-founded OpenAI in December 2015 alongside Altman, Sutskever and others. The company initially operated from Brockman's living room.

He led various projects at OpenAI, including OpenAI Gym and OpenAI Five, a Dota 2 bot.

On February 14, 2019, OpenAI announced that they had developed a new large language model called GPT-2, but kept it private due to their concern for its potential misuse. They released the model to a limited group of beta testers in May 2019.

On March 14, 2023, in a live video demo, Brockman unveiled GPT-4, the fourth iteration in the GPT series.

On November 17, 2023, alongside the firing of Sam Altman, Brockman was told he had been removed from the board. Sutskever supplied the board with a document of alleged bullying by Brockman. Mira Murati said Brockman's relationship with Altman made it impossible for her to do her job, and Altman had already "fielded many requests from OpenAI employees to rein in Brockman". Brockman was to report to Murati, but on November 17, he announced that he had quit the company.

On November 20, 2023, Microsoft CEO Satya Nadella announced that Brockman and Altman would join Microsoft to lead a new advanced AI research team. The following day, after a deal was reached to reinstate Altman as CEO, Brockman returned to OpenAI. Brockman took a sabbatical from August to November 2024.

In 2026, Brockman took over major roles at OpenAI, including product roles with the leave of Fidji Simo, and later greater leadership of day-today operation, product strategy and scaling efforts.

In October of 2026, Brockman and wife, Anna Brockman, pulled out of a $25 million donation they had planned to give to an artificial intelligence advocacy group.

=== Elon Musk lawsuit ===
Jury selection for OpenAI cofounder Elon Musk's lawsuit against OpenAI and its current executives, including Brockman, began on April 27, 2026. On April 28, 2026, Elon Musk began his testimony against Altman and OpenAI. On May 18, 2026, the jury decided in favor of Altman, Brockman and OpenAI, finding that Musk's claims were barred by the statute of limitations.

== Personal life ==
In November 2019 after a year of dating, Brockman married Anna at OpenAI's offices on a workday. Ilya Sutskever officiated the wedding. As of July 2026, Brockman's net worth was estimated at $25.5 billion according to Bloomberg Billionaires Index, with the vast majority of his fortune coming from his stake in OpenAI.

== Political activities ==
Brockman and his wife were the biggest donors to Donald Trump's Super PAC, MAGA Inc., in 2025 with each of them donating US$12.5 million. Brockman and his wife also donated $50 million to Leading the Future, a super PAC dedicated to AI deregulation that he helped found with Andreessen Horowitz co-founders Marc Andreessen and Ben Horowitz. OpenAI publicly expressed openness to increased regulatory oversight and has a policy against donating to such Super PACs. Greg & Anna donated $25 million to MAGA Inc. and $25 million Leading the Future in 2026.
