= Rob Fergus =

American computer scientist

- Education: University of Oxford; University of Cambridge
- Known for: ZFNet; Co-founding Meta AI; Co-founding CILVR Lab
- Scientific career
- Fields: Computer science Machine learning Deep learning
- Workplaces: New York University; Courant Institute of Mathematical Sciences; DeepMind; Meta AI (co-founder)

Rob Fergus is a British-American computer scientist working primarily in the fields of machine learning, deep learning, representational learning, and generative models. He is a professor of computer science at Courant Institute of Mathematical Sciences at New York University (NYU) and a research scientist at DeepMind. Fergus developed ZFNet in 2013 together with M.D. Zeiler, his PhD student in NYU.

Fergus co-founded Meta AI (then known as Facebook Artificial Intelligence Research (FAIR)) along with Yann Le Cun in September 2013. In 2009, Rob Fergus co-founded the Computational Intelligence, Learning, Vision, and Robotics (CILVR) Lab at NYU along with Yann Le Cun.

== Awards and recognition ==
Rob Fergus has been recognized in academia and received the following awards:

- NSF Faculty Early Career Development Program (CAREER)
- Sloan Research Fellowship
- Test-of-time awards at ECCV, CVPR and ICLR

== Notable PhD students ==
- Matt Zeiler (Clarifai founder)
- Wojciech Zaremba (OpenAI co-founder)
- Denis Yarats (Perplexity co-founder)
- Alex Rives (EvolutionaryScale co-founder; faculty at MIT)
