= Wojciech Zaremba =

Polish-American computer scientist

- Born: 30 November 1988 (age 37); Kluczbork, Poland
- Education: University of Warsaw (MS); École polytechnique New York University (PhD)
- Scientific career
- Fields: Mathematics; Computer science; Deep learning
- Workplaces: OpenAI
- Thesis: Learning algorithms from data (2016)
- Doctoral advisor: Yann LeCun; Rob Fergus

Wojciech Zaremba (Polish: [ˈvɔjt͡ɕɛx zaˈrɛmba]; born 30 November 1988) is a Polish computer scientist, mathematician, and co-founder of OpenAI (2016–present). He initially led OpenAI's work on robotics, notably creating a robotic arm capable of solving a Rubik's Cube. When the team was dissolved in 2020, he began leading teams working on OpenAI's GPT models, GitHub Copilot, and Codex.

== Early life and education ==
Zaremba was born in Kluczbork, Poland. At a young age, he won local competitions and awards in mathematics, computer science, chemistry and physics. In 2007, Zaremba represented Poland in the International Mathematical Olympiad in Vietnam, and won a silver medal. During his school years, he received a scholarship from the National Children's Fund (Polish: Krajowy Fundusz na rzecz Dzieci), an organization that supports exceptionally gifted students.

Zaremba studied at the University of Warsaw and École Polytechnique. He received a bachelor's degree in mathematics in 2010, followed by a bachelor's degree in computer science and a master's degree in mathematics in 2012, all from the University of Warsaw. He then began his PhD at New York University (NYU) in deep learning under the supervision of Yann LeCun and Rob Fergus. Zaremba graduated and received his PhD in 2016.

== Career ==
During his undergraduate studies, he completed an internship at Nvidia. His PhD was divided between Google Brain where he spent a year, and Facebook Artificial Intelligence Research where he spent another year.

During his stay at Google, he co-authored work on adversarial examples for neural networks. This paper contributed to foundational research regarding adversarial attacks on neural networks.

His PhD is focused on matching capabilities of neural networks with the algorithmic power of programmable computers.

In 2015, Zaremba became one of the co-founders of OpenAI, an artificial intelligence research company. In OpenAl, Zaremba has worked as robotics research manager until 2020, then managing the development of GitHub Copilot, and Codex, and GPT models underlying ChatGPT.

Zaremba sits on the advisory board of Growbots, a Silicon Valley startup company aiming to automate sales processes with the use of machine learning and artificial intelligence. He is also on the advisory board of the Qualia Research Institute.

== Honors and awards ==
- Listed among the most influential Polish under 30s, Polish edition of Forbes magazine 2017
- Google Fellowship 2015
- Silver Medal in 48th International Mathematical Olympiad, Vietnam
