= Inkling (large language model) =

Artificial intelligence LLM (released 2026)

- Developer: Thinking Machines Lab
- Release: July 15, 2026; 4 months ago
- Type: Large language model
- License: Apache 2.0
- Website: thinkingmachines.ai

Inkling is an open-weights large language model created by Thinking Machines company, first released on July 15, 2026. It is published under an Apache 2.0 license. The model allows text, images and audio as input, and can be used for tasks such as chat, software development, multilingual applications or agentic systems.

== Training ==
The first large language model released by Thinking Machines, Inkling was trained with 45 trillion tokens of text, image, audio, and video. It reasons natively from input in any of these four formats, while, at the moment, it can generate only text, including source code or structured data.

== Features ==
Inkling was designed to be adaptable and efficient when used in real-world workflows. The cost/performance relationship can be optimized, by programmatically adjusting the model's reasoning budget (that is, the amount of "thought" that the model must perform before generating an output), in a scale from 0.2 to 0.99. This way, different levels of "thinking" effort can be used according to the needs of each particular task.

Unlike most other large language models (including open-weight ones), Inkling was created with a focus on resistance to censorship, providing direct answers when questioned on censored or politically sensitive topics. Its creators recommend using external tools for content moderation, since they consider that internal safety evaluation in the language models occasionally doesn't prevent the model from complying with potentially harmful prompts that shouldn't be answered.

The model can be fine-tuned for a particular job by developers through Tinker platform, also from Thinking Machines, and they are able to deploy it through third-party providers.

== Technical information ==
The model allows for a context window of up to 1,048,576 tokens, and can be deployed using common inference libraries such as llama.cpp. It contains 975 billion parameters, with 41 billion of them being active at a time. The model has a mixture-of-experts design, and inputs are directed to the parts most suitable to handle them, to the response is generated with an efficient use of computing power.

The minimal hardware requirements include at least 2 TB of VRAM. A quantized version also exists, that cuts down this minimum value to 600 GB.

== Inkling 2 Mini ==
In November 2026, Thinking Machines released Inkling 2 Mini, an Apache 2.0-licensed open-weights multimodal model designed to be locally run in a single desktop GPU or a 32GB MacBook Pro. The model rivals much larger ones in software engineering and tool-use benchmarks.
