= OpenAI =

American artificial intelligence company

OpenAI Group PBC

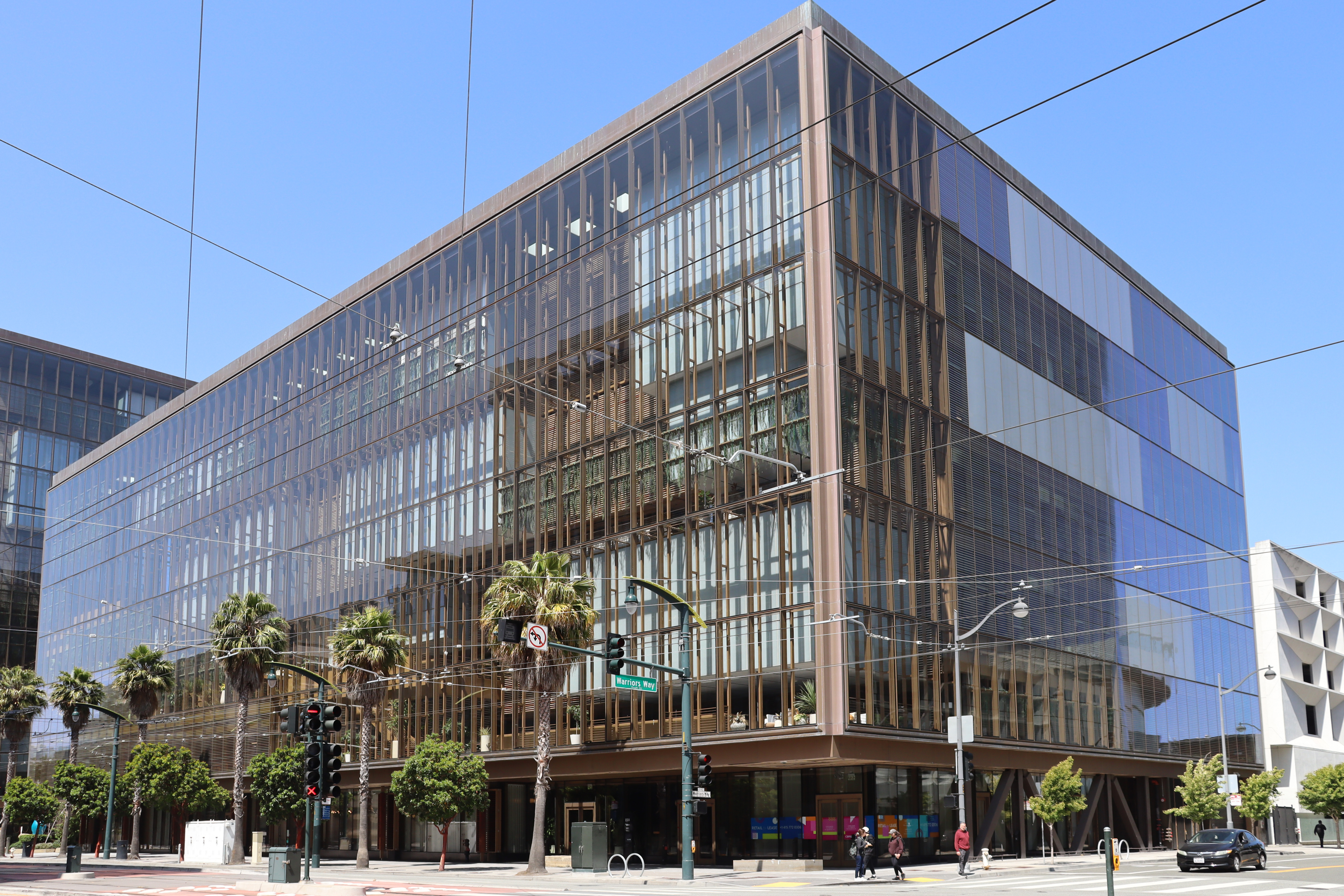
- Headquarters in 1515 Third Street, San Francisco
- Type: Private
- Industry: Artificial intelligence
- Founded: December 8, 2015; 10 years ago
- Founders: Elon Musk; Sam Altman; Ilya Sutskever; Greg Brockman; Trevor Blackwell (et al.) (Note: Vicki Cheung, Andrej Karpathy, Durk Kingma, John Schulman, Pamela Vagata, and Wojciech Zaremba are also among the list of founders.)
- Headquarters: 1455 and 1515 Third Street, San Francisco, California, U.S.
- Key people: Bret Taylor (chairman); Sam Altman (CEO); Greg Brockman (president and CEO of Applications); Sarah Friar (CFO)
- Products: ChatGPT; GPT-6; OpenAI Codex; GPT Image; Deep Research; Agents; ChatGPT Atlas; ChatGPT Health
- Revenue: ▲US$13.1 billion (2025)
- Net income: ▼US$−9 billion (2025 est.)
- Owners: Microsoft (23.3%); OpenAI Foundation (22.5%); Employees and Other Investors (54.2%)
- Number of employees: 4,500 (2026)
- Subsidiaries: OpenAI Deployment Company
- Website: openai.com

OpenAI Group PBC is an American artificial intelligence (AI) public benefit corporation (PBC) headquartered in San Francisco, California. It develops generative AI models, particularly its generative pre-trained transformer (GPT) series of large language models.

Its release of ChatGPT in November 2022 accelerated an AI boom, leading to widespread use of generative AI; as of September 2026, ChatGPT is the fifth-most-visited website globally. OpenAI also releases the GPT Image models and Codex, an AI coding agent. In March 2026, OpenAI closed a funding round with a post-money valuation of US$852 billion, making it one of the most valuable AI pure play companies in the world, rivalled only by Anthropic.

OpenAI was founded in 2015 as a nonprofit, with Elon Musk and Sam Altman as co-chairs; Musk resigned in 2018. A for-profit subsidiary was created in 2019, and a 2025 restructuring converted the subsidiary into OpenAI Group PBC, that is 26% owned by the nonprofit OpenAI Foundation. Microsoft has invested over $13 billion into OpenAI. OpenAI partners with the US government via the Stargate Project infrastructure venture, and with the Department of Defense, Los Alamos National Laboratory, and arms company Anduril Industries. Former OpenAI personnel have founded competing AI companies including Anthropic, Safe Superintelligence Inc., xAI, and Thinking Machines Lab.

OpenAI has faced multiple lawsuits for alleged deaths linked to its chatbots and copyright infringement against authors and media companies. Several US states have sued, alleging harm to children, claiming it coaches self-harm and encourages delusions.

In November 2023, OpenAI's board removed Sam Altman as CEO, citing a lack of confidence, but reinstated him five days later after a board reconstruction. In 2024, roughly half of OpenAI's AI safety researchers left the company, often citing the company's deprioritization of safety. In mid-2026, hundreds of OpenAI agents gained unintended internet access and conducted autonomous hacks, including against Hugging Face and against Australia's Medicare. In late 2026, OpenAI published hundreds of claimed solutions to open mathematics problems, including Navier–Stokes existence and smoothness—a Millennium Prize Problem. OpenAI has filed for an initial public offering, but its size and timeline were not publicly disclosed.

== Founding ==
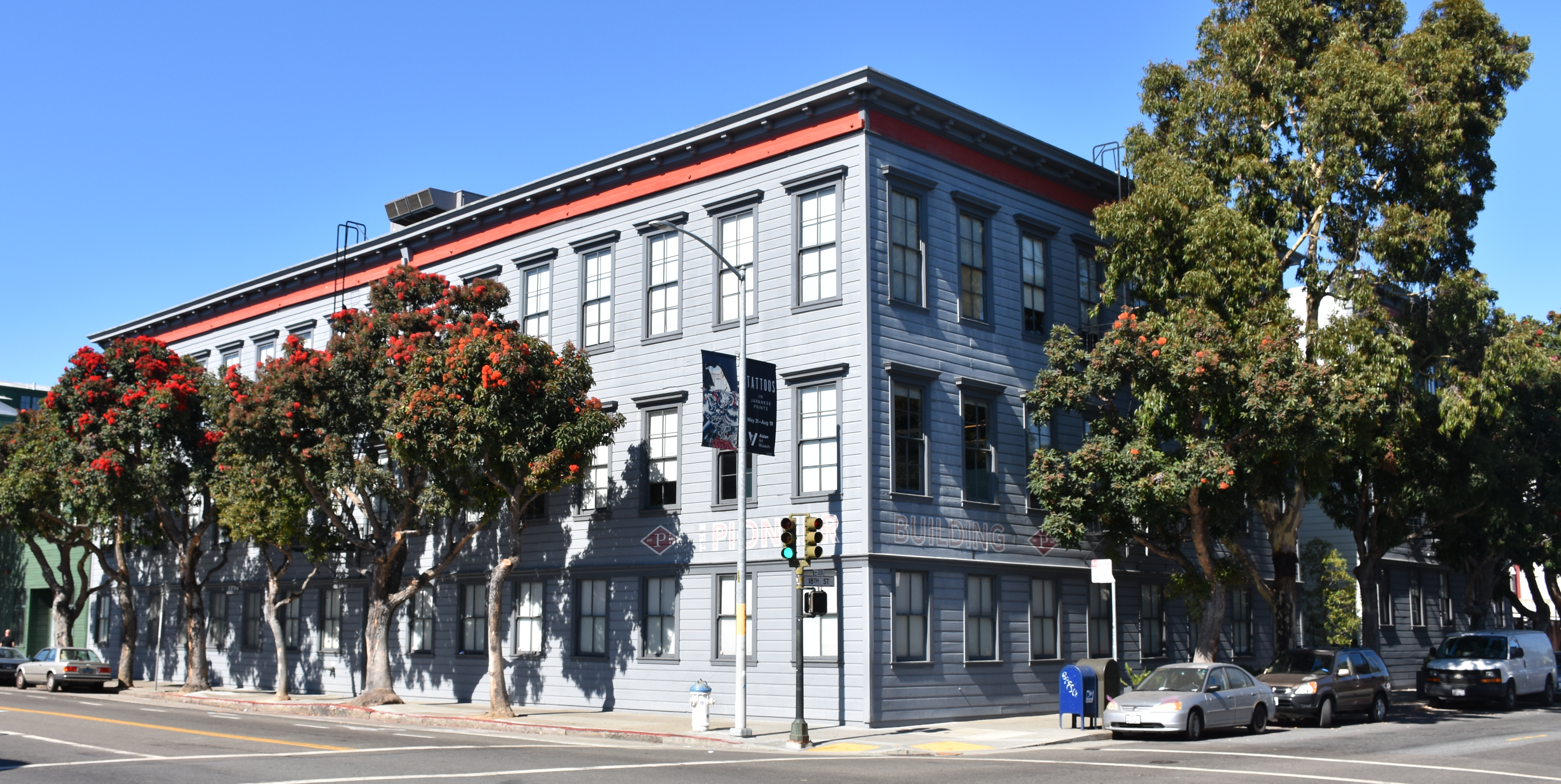
Former headquarters at the Pioneer Building in San Francisco

In December 2015, OpenAI was founded as the nonprofit organization OpenAI, Inc., by Elon Musk, Sam Altman, Ilya Sutskever, Greg Brockman, Trevor Blackwell, Vicki Cheung, Andrej Karpathy, Durk Kingma, John Schulman, Pamela Vagata, and Wojciech Zaremba, with Musk and Altman as the co-chairs. A total of $1 billion in capital was pledged by Musk, Altman, Greg Brockman, Reid Hoffman, Jessica Livingston, Peter Thiel, Amazon Web Services (AWS), and Infosys. However, the actual capital collected significantly lagged pledges. According to tax filings, only $133 million had been received by 2021.

Musk stated in 2015 that he was partly motivated by concerns about AI safety and existential risk from artificial general intelligence. OpenAI stated that "it's hard to fathom how much human-level AI could benefit society", and that it is equally difficult to comprehend "how much it could damage society if built or used incorrectly". The startup also wrote that AI "should be an extension of individual human wills and, in the spirit of liberty, as broadly and evenly distributed as possible", and that "because of AI's surprising history, it's hard to predict when human-level AI might come within reach. When it does, it'll be important to have a leading research institution which can prioritize a good outcome for all over its own self-interest." Altman expected a decades-long project that eventually surpasses human intelligence.

In its founding charter, OpenAI defined its mission as ensuring that artificial general intelligence (AGI) "benefits all of humanity", and stated an intention to collaborate openly with other institutions by making certain patents and research publicly available, but later restricted access to its most capable models, citing competitive and safety concerns. OpenAI was initially run from Brockman's living room. In September 2016, it moved to the Pioneer Building in the Mission District, San Francisco.

Brockman met with Yoshua Bengio, one of the "founding fathers" of deep learning, and drew up a list of great AI researchers. Brockman was able to hire nine of them as the first employees in December 2015. OpenAI did not pay AI researchers salaries comparable to those of Facebook or Google. It also did not pay stock options which AI researchers typically get. Nevertheless, OpenAI spent $7 million on its first 52 employees in 2016. OpenAI's potential and mission drew these researchers to the firm; a Google employee said he was willing to leave Google for OpenAI "partly because of the very strong group of people and, to a very large extent, because of its mission." OpenAI co-founder Wojciech Zaremba stated that he turned down "borderline crazy" offers of two to three times his market value to join OpenAI instead.

In April 2016, OpenAI released a public beta of "OpenAI Gym", its platform for reinforcement learning research. Nvidia gifted its first DGX-1 supercomputer to OpenAI in August 2016 to help it train larger and more complex AI models with the capability of reducing processing time from six days to two hours. In December 2016, OpenAI released "Universe", a software platform for measuring and training an AI's general intelligence across the world's supply of games, websites, and other applications.

== Corporate structure ==
=== Transition from nonprofit ===
==== Creation of for-profit subsidiaries ====
In 2019, OpenAI transitioned from nonprofit to "capped" for-profit, with the profit being capped at 100 times any investment. OpenAI formed three subsidiaries: the holding company OpenAI LP, the holding company OpenAI GP LLC, and the capped for-profit company OpenAI Global, LLC. The holding company OpenAI LP was owned by the nonprofit OpenAI, Inc., OpenAI employees, and investors, whereas OpenAI Global, LLC, was owned by OpenAI LP and Microsoft, the latter of which had a minority non-voting stake. The nonprofit OpenAI, Inc., controlled OpenAI GP LLC, which in turn controlled OpenAI LP and OpenAI Global, LLC.

OpenAI stated that the capped-profit model would allow it to legally attract investment from venture funds and compensate employees with equity as competing AI companies did. Microsoft subsequently invested $1 billion in OpenAI LP, and OpenAI's services were migrated to Microsoft Azure. Since then, OpenAI systems have run on an Azure-based supercomputing platform.

The 2019 restructuring made the nonprofit OpenAI, Inc., the only controlling shareholder of OpenAI LP, which retained a formal fiduciary responsibility to OpenAI, Inc.'s nonprofit charter. A majority of OpenAI, Inc.'s board was barred from having financial stakes in OpenAI LP. In addition, minority members with a stake in OpenAI LP were barred from certain votes due to conflict of interest. Some researchers have argued that OpenAI's switch to for-profit status was inconsistent with OpenAI's claims to be "democratizing" AI.

==== Conversion to public benefit corporation ====
OpenAI's corporate structure, as of May 2026

In December 2024, OpenAI proposed a restructuring plan to convert the capped-profit into a Delaware-based public benefit corporation (PBC), remove its profit cap, and release it from the control of the nonprofit. The nonprofit would sell its control and other assets, getting equity in return, and would use it to fund and pursue separate charitable projects, including in science and education. OpenAI's leadership described the change as necessary to secure additional investments, and stated that the nonprofit's founding mission to ensure AGI "benefits all of humanity" would be better fulfilled.

The plan has been criticized by former employees. A legal letter named "Not For Private Gain" asked the attorneys general of California and Delaware to intervene, stating that the restructuring is illegal and would remove governance safeguards from the nonprofit and the attorneys general. The letter argues that OpenAI's original complex structure was deliberately designed to remain accountable to its mission, without the conflicting pressure of maximizing profits. It contends that the nonprofit is best positioned to advance its mission of ensuring AGI benefits all of humanity by continuing to control OpenAI Global, LLC, whatever the amount of equity that it could get in exchange. PBCs can choose how they balance their mission with profit-making. Controlling shareholders have a large influence on how closely a PBC sticks to its mission. OpenAI subpoenaed six nonprofit organizations that opposed its for-profit transition, which the organizations described as an attempt to silence them.

On October 28, 2025, OpenAI announced that it had adopted the new PBC corporate structure after receiving approval from the attorneys general of California and Delaware. Under the new structure, OpenAI's for-profit branch became a PBC known as OpenAI Group PBC, while the nonprofit was renamed to the OpenAI Foundation. The OpenAI Foundation holds a 26% stake in the PBC, while Microsoft holds a 27% stake and the remaining 47% is owned by employees and other investors.

All members of the OpenAI Group PBC board of directors are to be appointed by the OpenAI Foundation, which can remove them at any time. As of April 2026, all but one of the board members of the OpenAI Foundation were also board members of OpenAI Group PBC. In April 2026, co-founder Musk revised his lawsuit against OpenAI and Altman to seek the reversal of OpenAI's corporate restructuring. Musk lost the lawsuit in May 2026, with the jury concluding that he waited beyond the three-year statute of limitations to sue OpenAI.

Altman stated that an initial public offering (IPO) was the most likely path forward. On June 8, 2026, OpenAI confirmed it filed for an IPO with the US Securities and Exchange Commission (SEC), but stated "it could be a while because there are things we want to do that are likely easier as a private company." Altman confirmed in September that the IPO was delayed until 2027.

=== Partnership with Microsoft ===
Following its original $1 billion investment in 2019 which began an AI boom, Microsoft invested another $2 billion through 2022. On January 23, 2023, Microsoft announced an additional $10 billion investment in OpenAI over multiple years, of which a significant portion would be used to purchase compute on Microsoft Azure. These investments were made at a $29 billion valuation, double OpenAI's 2021 valuation. Later that year, Microsoft began using OpenAI models for its Copilot chatbot, integrated Copilot into Windows, and released mobile Copilot apps.

Following OpenAI's 2025 restructuring, Microsoft owned a 27% stake in the for-profit OpenAI Group PBC, valued at $135 billion. In a deal announced the same day, OpenAI agreed to purchase $250 billion of Azure services, with Microsoft ceding their right of first refusal over OpenAI's future cloud computing purchases. As part of the deal, OpenAI will continue to share 20% of its revenue with Microsoft until it achieves AGI, which must now be verified by an independent panel of experts. The deal also loosened restrictions on both companies working with third parties, allowing Microsoft to pursue AGI independently and allowing OpenAI to develop products with other companies.

In April 2026, the two firms announced a new agreement which removed many of the more restrictive aspects of their partnership. No longer the exclusive cloud provider, Microsoft then had the first right to provide cloud services, but OpenAI could purchase other services in the event that Microsoft did not provide sufficient capacity. OpenAI will no longer receive a portion of Microsoft's revenue from using OpenAI's technology. The clause, which created uncertainty for Microsoft in the event OpenAI determined that OpenAI had created AGI, was dropped.

=== Finances ===
In 2017, OpenAI spent $7.9 million, a quarter of its functional expenses, on cloud computing. In comparison, Google DeepMind's total expenses in 2017 were $442 million. In the summer of 2018, training OpenAI's Dota 2 bots required renting 128,000 CPUs and 256 GPUs from Google for multiple weeks.

In October 2024, OpenAI completed a $6.6 billion capital raise with a $157 billion valuation including investments from Microsoft, Nvidia, and SoftBank.

On January 21, 2025, President Donald Trump announced The Stargate Project, a joint venture between OpenAI, Oracle, SoftBank and MGX to build an AI infrastructure system in conjunction with the US government. The project takes its name from OpenAI's existing "Stargate" supercomputer project and was estimated to cost $500 billion. The partners planned to fund the project over the next four years. In July, the United States Department of Defense announced that OpenAI had received a $200 million contract for AI in the military, along with Anthropic, Google, and xAI. In the same month, OpenAI made a deal with the UK Government to use ChatGPT and other AI tools in public services. OpenAI also began a $50 million fund to support nonprofit and community organizations.

In April 2025, OpenAI raised $40 billion at a $300 billion post-money valuation, which was the highest-value private technology deal in history. The financing round was led by SoftBank, with other participants including Microsoft, Coatue, Altimeter and Thrive.

In July 2025, the company reported annualized revenue of $12 billion. This was an increase from $3.7 billion in 2024, which was driven by ChatGPT subscriptions, which reached 20 million paid subscribers by April 2025, up from 15.5 million at the end of 2024, alongside a rapidly expanding enterprise customer base that grew to five million business users.

In February 2026, OpenAI raised $110 billion at a $730 billion valuation, led by Amazon ($50 billion), SoftBank ($30 billion), and Nvidia ($30 billion), surpassing the prior round as the largest private technology fundraise in history. The round was extended to $120 billion in March 2026. In April 2026, the company announced that it closed a funding round of $122 billion in committed capital at a post-money valuation of $852 billion.

== Business model ==
OpenAI uses a tiered revenue model that combines free consumer access, paid subscription services, enterprise licensing, and application programming interface (API) usage-based pricing. The basic functionality is provided at no cost, while advanced capabilities are offered through paid plans such as ChatGPT Plus and enterprise solutions. OpenAI's subscription and enterprise offerings are structured around scalable compute usage and API integration into third-party platforms. In 2025, the company reported significant revenue growth associated with expanded computing infrastructure and enterprise adoption.

The company's cash burn remains high because of the intensive computational costs required to train and operate large language models. According to financial statements reported in June 2026, OpenAI recorded an operating loss of US$20.92 billion in 2025, compared with US$8.78 billion in 2024. with annual expenditures projected to escalate significantly, reaching $17 billion in 2026, $35 billion in 2027, and $45 billion in 2028. These expenditures are primarily allocated toward expanding compute infrastructure, developing proprietary AI chips, constructing data centers, and funding intensive model training programs, with more than half of the spending through the end of the decade expected to support research-intensive compute for model training and development.

The company's financial strategy prioritizes market expansion and technological advancement over near-term profitability, with OpenAI's 2025 forecast predicting cash-flow-positive operations by 2029 and projecting revenue of approximately $200 billion by 2030.

In October 2025, OpenAI completed an employee share sale of up to $10 billion to existing investors which valued the company at $500 billion. The deal valued OpenAI as the most valuable privately owned company in the world—surpassing SpaceX as the world's most valuable private company.

In April 2026, reports indicated that OpenAI projected approximately $2.5 billion in advertising revenue for the year, with estimates rising to $100 billion annually by 2030, highlighting advertising as a key component of its future business strategy.

In June 2026, it was announced that OpenAI and the White House have been in ongoing talks for about a year to allow a possible government stake in the company.

In August 2026, OpenAI said its advertising business had reached an annualized revenue run rate of $1 billion, roughly 200 days after its launch.

In August 2026, OpenAI announced that it had terminated API access for the AI coding tool Cursor following Cursor's acquisition by SpaceX.

=== OpenAI Deployment Company ===
In May 2026, OpenAI launched the OpenAI Deployment Company (DeployCo), a majority-owned and controlled company providing deployment and integration services for OpenAI's artificial intelligence systems. DeployCo received more than $4 billion in initial investment from a group led by TPG, with Advent International, Bain Capital and Brookfield as co-lead founding partners. Axios reported that the investment valued the company at $10 billion before the financing and $14 billion afterward.

DeployCo employs forward-deployed engineers who work with client organizations to deploy AI systems. The Financial Times compared the approach to the deployment model used by Palantir Technologies, which popularized the forward-deployed engineering role. At its launch, DeployCo agreed to acquire AI consulting and engineering firm Tomoro, adding approximately 150 engineers and deployment specialists. In July, DeployCo agreed to acquire Northslope, an applied AI company founded by former Palantir employees.

=== Acquisitions ===
In August 2023, it was announced that OpenAI had acquired the New York-based start-up Global Illumination, a company that deploys AI to develop digital infrastructure and creative tools.

In June 2024, OpenAI acquired Multi, a startup focused on remote collaboration.

On February 10, 2025, a consortium of investors led by Elon Musk submitted a $97.4 billion unsolicited bid to buy the nonprofit that controls OpenAI, declaring willingness to match or exceed any better offer. The offer was rejected on February 14, 2025, with OpenAI stating that it was not for sale, but the offer complicated Altman's restructuring plan by suggesting a lower bar for how much the nonprofit should be valued.

In March 2025, OpenAI reached a deal with CoreWeave to acquire $350 million worth of CoreWeave shares and access to AI infrastructure, in return for $11.9 billion paid over five years. Microsoft was already CoreWeave's biggest customer in 2024. Alongside their other business dealings, OpenAI and Microsoft were renegotiating the terms of their partnership to facilitate a potential future IPO by OpenAI, while ensuring Microsoft's continued access to advanced AI models. On May 21, 2025 OpenAI announced the $6.5 billion acquisition of io, an AI hardware start-up founded by former Apple designer Jony Ive in 2024.

In September 2025, OpenAI agreed to acquire the product testing startup Statsig for $1.1 billion in an all-stock deal and appointed Statsig's founding CEO Vijaye Raji as OpenAI's chief technology officer of applications. The company also announced development of an AI-driven hiring service designed to rival LinkedIn. OpenAI acquired personal finance app Roi in October 2025. In October 2025, OpenAI acquired Software Applications Incorporated, the developer of Sky, a macOS-based natural language interface designed to operate across desktop applications. The Sky team joined OpenAI, and the company announced plans to integrate Sky's capabilities into ChatGPT. In December 2025, it was announced OpenAI had agreed to acquire Neptune, an AI tooling startup that helps companies track and manage model training, for an undisclosed amount.

In January 2026, it was announced OpenAI had acquired healthcare technology startup Torch for approximately $60 million. The acquisition followed the launch of OpenAI's ChatGPT Health product and was intended to strengthen the company's medical data and healthcare artificial intelligence capabilities. OpenAI acquired Python tool developer Astral in March 2026.

In April 2026, the company acquired TBPN, a media company in California, for an undisclosed sum.

In June 2026, OpenAI disclosed plans to acquire data and technology firm Ona to further expand its technical operations and infrastructure capabilities.

=== Corporate partnerships ===
==== Computing ====
In 2024, OpenAI began collaborating with Broadcom to design a custom AI chip capable of both training and inference, targeted for mass production in 2026 and to be manufactured by TSMC on a 3 nm process node. This initiative intended to reduce OpenAI's dependence on Nvidia GPUs, which are costly and face high demand in the market. On June 24, 2026, OpenAI announced its new chip called Jalapeño, created in collaboration with Broadcom. The company plans to start rolling it out by the end of 2026.

In June 2025, OpenAI began renting Google Cloud's Tensor Processing Units (TPUs) to support ChatGPT and related services, marking its first meaningful use of non‑Nvidia AI chips. In September, OpenAI signed a contract with Oracle to purchase $300 billion in computing power over the next five years. OpenAI and Nvidia then announced a potential deployment of at least 10 gigawatts of Nvidia systems and a $100 billion investment from Nvidia in OpenAI. However the plan was first scaled back, and in August 2026 amended to lease an 8 GW data center in Pike County, Ohio owned by SB Energy. Nvidia will provide $105 billion as a financial backstop.

In October 2025, OpenAI announced a five-year multi-billion dollar deal with AMD. OpenAI committed to purchasing six gigawatts worth of AMD chips, starting with the MI450. OpenAI will have the option to buy up to 160 million shares of AMD, about 10% of the company, depending on development, performance and share price targets.

In November 2025, OpenAI announced a "multi-year strategic partnership" with Amazon Web Services (AWS), beginning its use of their cloud computing. The infrastructure and investment agreement - valued at $38 billion - integrated OpenAI models into Amazon Bedrock and established collaborative frameworks to co-create advanced developer environments, such as a stateful runtime environment and exclusive third-party cloud distribution for enterprise agent platforms.

Following an initial partnership established in October 2023 to deploy generative AI models in the region, cooperation between OpenAI and Abu Dhabi's G42 expanded into capital and infrastructure agreements. This included investment participation by Abu Dhabi's AI fund MGX and plans for the Stargate UAE computer cluster. The collaboration extended further in November 2026 when national energy firm ADNOC signed an agreement with OpenAI and G42 at the Abu Dhabi International Petroleum Exhibition and Conference (ADIPEC). The accord integrated OpenAI models into ADNOC operations to assist with field master planning, data management, and supply chain forecasting.

==== Other ====
In January 2024, Arizona State University purchased ChatGPT Enterprise in OpenAI's first deal with a university.

In December 2025, Disney said it would make a $1 billion investment in OpenAI, and signed a three-year licensing deal that will let users generate videos using Sora—OpenAI's short-form AI video platform. More than 200 Disney, Marvel, Star Wars and Pixar characters would be available to OpenAI users. Disney would later exit this deal in late March 2026, due to Sora being discontinued.

In early 2026, Amazon entered advanced discussions to invest up to $50 billion in OpenAI as part of a potential artificial intelligence partnership. Under the proposed agreement, OpenAI's models could be integrated into Amazon's digital assistant Alexa and other internal projects.

In June 2026, OpenAI announced partnerships with Wix, Base44, Replit, Lovable, Figma, and Emergent to support its new Sites feature in Codex, which enables users to publish outputs as hosted, interactive websites rather than local files.

In June 2024, Apple Inc. signed a contract with OpenAI to integrate ChatGPT features into its products as part of its new Apple Intelligence initiative.

In December 2024, OpenAI partnered with Anduril Industries to develop and deploy advanced artificial intelligence solutions for national security missions.

=== Government contracting ===
OpenAI provides LLMs to the Artificial Intelligence Cyber Challenge and to the Advanced Research Projects Agency for Health. In October 2024, The Intercept revealed that OpenAI's tools are considered "essential" for AFRICOM's mission and included in an "Exception to Fair Opportunity" contractual agreement between the United States Department of Defense (DoD) and Microsoft. In December 2024, OpenAI said it would partner with defense-tech company Anduril to build drone defense technologies for the United States and its allies.

In January 2025, OpenAI partnered with Los Alamos National Laboratory to install GPT models on the Venado supercomputer at the Nicholas C. Metropolis Center for Modeling and Simulation. The supercomputer is used for nuclear stockpile stewardship.

In June 2025, OpenAI's Chief Product Officer, Kevin Weil, was commissioned lieutenant colonel in the U.S. Army to join Detachment 201 as senior advisor.

Also in June 2025, the DoD awarded OpenAI a $200 million one-year contract to develop AI tools for military and national security applications. OpenAI announced a new program, OpenAI for Government, to give federal, state, and local governments access to its models, including ChatGPT.

On February 28, 2026, after OpenAI's competitor Anthropic refused to authorize the DoD to use its AI systems for mass surveillance or autonomous weapons systems, Anthropic was labeled a "supply-chain risk" by the DoD, and the Trump administration decided to stop using it across the government. The same day, OpenAI announced that it had reached an agreement with the DoD to deploy its models in the government's classified network. Altman wrote, "Two of our most important safety principles are prohibitions on domestic mass surveillance and human responsibility for the use of force, including for autonomous weapon systems", that the DoD agrees with this, and that this is included in their agreement. However, while the agreement mentioned existing law and allowed OpenAI to implement some technical safeguards, it did not incorporate legally binding prohibitions on domestic mass surveillance or fully autonomous weapons. Following backlash over the potential use of ChatGPT for surveillance, Altman amended the contract to include more safeguards, though only excerpts of the contract were made public and critics remained concerned that it was purposefully vague and contained carve-outs for domestic surveillance.

== Services ==
=== Products ===
- ChatGPT
  - ChatGPT Deep Research
  - ChatGPT Search
  - ChatGPT Atlas
- OpenAI Codex
  - Codex CLI
- GPT Image
- Whisper (speech recognition system)
- An API that gives access to various OpenAI models

=== Development ===
In February 2019, GPT-2 was announced, which gained attention for its ability to generate human-like text.

In 2020, OpenAI announced GPT-3, a language model trained on large internet datasets. GPT-3 is aimed at natural language answering questions, but it can also translate between languages and coherently generate improvised text. It also announced that an associated API, named the API, would form the heart of its first commercial product.

Eleven employees left OpenAI, mostly between December 2020 and January 2021, in order to establish Anthropic.

In 2021, OpenAI introduced DALL-E, a specialized deep learning model adept at generating complex digital images from textual descriptions, utilizing a variant of the GPT-3 architecture.

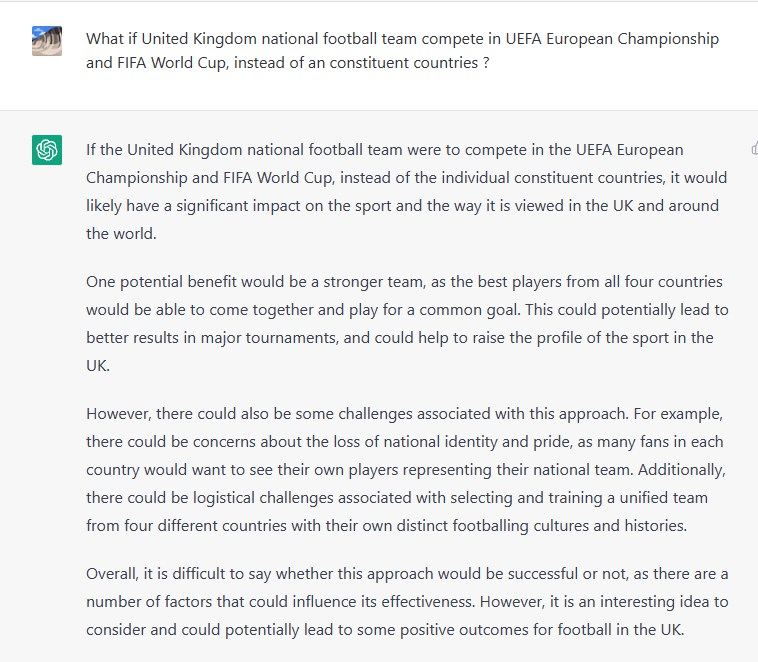
The release of ChatGPT was a major event in the AI boom. By January 2023, ChatGPT had become what was then the fastest-growing consumer software application in history, gaining over 100 million users in two months.

In December 2022, OpenAI received widespread media coverage after launching a free preview of ChatGPT, its new AI chatbot based on GPT-3.5. According to OpenAI, the preview received over a million signups within the first five days. According to anonymous sources cited by Reuters in December 2022, OpenAI Global, LLC was projecting $200 million of revenue in 2023 and $1 billion in revenue in 2024.

After ChatGPT was launched, Google announced a similar chatbot, Bard, amid internal concerns that ChatGPT could threaten Google's position as a primary source of online information.

On February 7, 2023, Microsoft announced that it was building AI technology based on the same foundation as ChatGPT into Microsoft Bing, Edge, Microsoft 365 and other products.

On March 14, 2023, OpenAI released GPT-4, both as an API (with a waitlist) and as a feature of ChatGPT Plus.

On November 6, 2023, OpenAI launched GPTs, allowing individuals to create customized versions of ChatGPT for specific purposes, further expanding the possibilities of AI applications across various industries. On November 14, 2023, OpenAI announced they temporarily suspended new sign-ups for ChatGPT Plus due to high demand. Access for newer subscribers re-opened a month later on December 13.

In December 2024, the company launched the Sora model. It also launched OpenAI o1, an early reasoning model that was internally codenamed strawberry. Additionally, ChatGPT Pro—a $200/month subscription service offering unlimited o1 access and enhanced voice features—was introduced, and preliminary benchmark results for the upcoming OpenAI o3 models were shared.

On January 23, 2025, OpenAI released Operator, an AI agent and tool for accessing websites to execute goals defined by users. The feature was only available to Pro users in the United States. OpenAI released deep research agent, nine days later. It scored a 27% accuracy on the benchmark Humanity's Last Exam (HLE). Altman later stated GPT-4.5 would be the last model without full chain-of-thought reasoning.

In July 2025, according to OpenAI, one of its experimental models performed at a gold medal-level at the International Mathematical Olympiad.

On October 6, 2025, OpenAI displayed its Agent Builder platform during the company's DevDay event. The platform includes a visual drag-and-drop interface for agentic workflows.

On October 21, 2025, OpenAI introduced ChatGPT Atlas, a web browser which integrates ChatGPT into web navigation.

On December 11, 2025, OpenAI announced GPT-5.2.

In early 2026, reports indicated that OpenAI was working on a collaborative software development platform designed to compete with services such as GitHub and GitLab.

On March 24, 2026, OpenAI announced that they would discontinue the Sora app, as well as developer access to the API for the Sora model.

On September 3, 2026, GPT-6 Astra was initially released to approved users, followed by general public availability the following day.

On September 14, 2026, OpenAI developed Habitat, an online storage platform, to manage over 70 million data requests per second to support products like ChatGPT and Codex across nearly 40 regions, handling more than 500 petabytes of data.

On October 30, 2026, OpenAI announced that it would support a shared signal in the robots.txt files of websites, allowing publishers and websites operators to communicate their preferences regarding the use of their content for foundational generative AI training across multiple participating providers. The initiative is based on work within the Internet Engineering Task Force's (IETF) AI preferences working group and is intended to reduce the need for website operators to maintain separate crawler instructions for individual AI companies. OpenAI stated that it planned to implement the signal in the coming months and that the mechanism would operate alongside its existing crawler controls.

=== Transparency ===
In March 2023, the company was criticized for disclosing particularly few technical details about products like GPT-4, contradicting its initial commitment to openness and making it harder for independent researchers to replicate its work and develop safeguards. OpenAI cited competitiveness and safety concerns to justify this repudiation. OpenAI's former chief scientist Ilya Sutskever argued in 2023 that open-sourcing increasingly capable models was increasingly risky, and that the safety reasons for not open-sourcing the most potent AI models would become "obvious" in a few years.

In September 2025, OpenAI published a study on how people use ChatGPT for everyday tasks. The study found that "non-work tasks" (according to an LLM-based classifier) account for more than 72 percent of all ChatGPT usage, with a minority of overall usage related to business productivity.

On September 16, 2026, OpenAI announced a new framework for tracking and disclosing instances of their technology exhibiting unsafe behavior. The announcement came in a blog post where the company also disclosed six examples of such behavior.

=== Alignment ===
In July 2023, OpenAI launched the superalignment project, aiming within four years to determine how to align future superintelligent systems. OpenAI promised to dedicate 20% of its computing resources to the project, although the company's employees later reported that the company only allocated 1–2% of its resources to it. OpenAI ended the project in May 2024 after its co-leaders Ilya Sutskever and Jan Leike left the company.

=== Conversation sharing ===
In August 2025, OpenAI rolled back a new experimental "share with search engines" feature. The opt-in toggle, intended to allow users to make specific chats discoverable through search engines like Google, was criticized after some users who misunderstood it shared discussions including personal details such as names, locations, and intimate topics. OpenAI announced the feature's permanent removal on August 1, 2025, and the company began coordinating with search providers to remove the exposed content, emphasizing that it was not a security breach but a design flaw that heightened privacy risks. CEO Sam Altman acknowledged the issue in a podcast, noting users often treat ChatGPT as a confidant for deeply personal matters, which amplified concerns about AI handling sensitive data.

== Management ==
=== Key employees ===
- CEO and co-founder: Sam Altman, former president of the start-up accelerator Y Combinator
- President and co-founder: Greg Brockman, former CTO, 3rd employee of Stripe
- Chief Scientist Officer: Jakub Pachocki, former director of research at OpenAI
- Chief Financial Officer: Sarah Friar, former Nextdoor CEO and former CFO at Block, Inc.
- Chief Research Officer: Mark Chen, former SVP of research at OpenAI
- Chief Compliance Officer: Scott Schools, former chief compliance officer of Uber
- Chief Global Affairs Officer: Chris Lehane, former head of global policy at Airbnb
- Chief Economist: Aaron Chatterji, professor of business and public policy at Duke University's Fuqua School of Business

=== Board of directors of the OpenAI nonprofit ===
- Bret Taylor (chairman), former chairman of Twitter's board of directors and co-CEO of Salesforce
- Sam Altman, CEO and co-founder
- Adam D'Angelo, co-founder and CEO of Quora
- Sue Desmond-Hellmann, former CEO of the Bill & Melinda Gates Foundation
- Nicole Seligman, attorney and former executive vice president of the Sony Corporation
- Paul Nakasone, former director of the National Security Agency (2018–2024)
- Zico Kolter, computer scientist
- Adebayo Ogunlesi, managing partner at Global Infrastructure Partners

=== Principal individual investors ===
- Elon Musk, co-founder
- Peter Thiel, PayPal co-founder
- Jessica Livingston, a founding partner of Y Combinator
- Reid Hoffman, LinkedIn co-founder

=== Firing of Altman ===
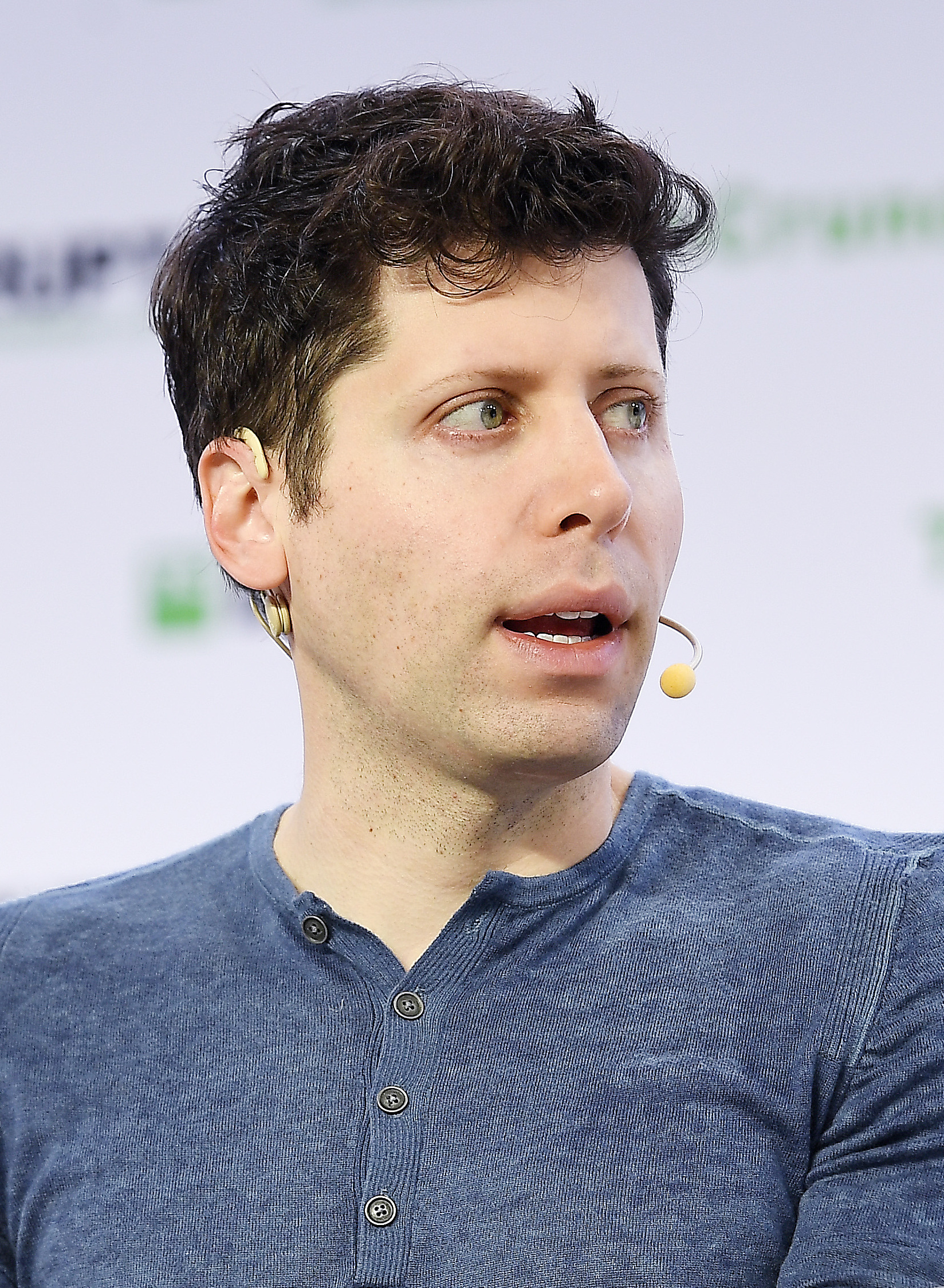
Sam Altman in 2019

On November 17, 2023, Sam Altman was removed as CEO when OpenAI's board of directors (composed of Helen Toner, Ilya Sutskever, Adam D'Angelo and Tasha McCauley) cited a lack of confidence in him. Chief Technology Officer Mira Murati took over as interim CEO. Greg Brockman, the president of OpenAI, was also removed as chairman of the board and resigned from the company's presidency shortly thereafter. Three senior OpenAI researchers subsequently resigned: director of research and GPT-4 lead Jakub Pachocki, head of AI risk Aleksander Mądry, and researcher Szymon Sidor.

On November 18, 2023, there were reportedly talks of Altman returning as CEO amid pressure placed upon the board by investors such as Microsoft and Thrive Capital, who objected to Altman's departure. Although Altman himself spoke in favor of returning to OpenAI, he has since stated that he considered starting a new company and bringing former OpenAI employees with him if talks to reinstate him did not work out. Altman insisted multiple times that all board members who supported his removal should resign; the board members agreed "in principle" to resign if Altman returned. On November 19, 2023, negotiations with Altman to return failed and Murati was replaced by Emmett Shear as interim CEO. The board initially contacted Anthropic CEO Dario Amodei (a former OpenAI executive) about replacing Altman, and proposed a merger of the two companies, but both offers were declined.

On November 20, 2023, Microsoft CEO Satya Nadella announced Altman and Brockman would be joining Microsoft to lead a new advanced AI research team, but added that they were still committed to OpenAI despite recent events. Before the partnership with Microsoft was finalized, Altman gave the board another opportunity to negotiate with him. About 738 of OpenAI's 770 employees, including Murati and Sutskever, signed an open letter stating they would quit their jobs and join Microsoft if the board did not rehire Altman and then resign. This prompted OpenAI investors to consider legal action against the board as well. In response, OpenAI management sent an internal memo to employees stating that negotiations with Altman and the board had resumed and would take some time.

On November 21, 2023, after continued negotiations, Altman and Brockman returned to the company in their prior roles along with a reconstructed board made up of new members Bret Taylor (as chairman) and Lawrence Summers, with D'Angelo remaining. According to subsequent reporting, shortly before Altman's firing, some employees raised concerns to the board about how he had handled the safety implications of a recent internal AI capability discovery. On November 29, 2023, OpenAI announced that an anonymous Microsoft employee had joined the board as a non-voting member to observe the company's operations; Microsoft resigned from the board in July 2024.

In February 2024, the Securities and Exchange Commission subpoenaed OpenAI's internal communication to determine if Altman's alleged lack of candor misled investors. Following the temporary removal of Sam Altman and his return, many employees gradually left OpenAI, including most of the original leadership team and a significant number of AI safety researchers.

=== Personnel changes ===
Former OpenAI employees have founded many further AI startups, including Dario Amodei and Daniela Amodei (left 2021, founding its largest competitor Anthropic), Ilya Sutskever (left May 2024, founded Safe Superintelligence Inc.), Mira Murati (left September 2024, founded Thinking Machines Lab), and Aravind Srinivasan (left 2022, founded Perplexity AI).

In 2018, Musk resigned from his Board of Directors seat, citing "a potential future conflict [of interest]" with his role as CEO of Tesla due to Tesla's AI development for self-driving cars. OpenAI stated that Musk's financial contributions were below $45 million.

On March 3, 2023, Reid Hoffman resigned from his board seat, citing a desire to avoid conflicts of interest with his investments in AI companies via Greylock Partners, and his co-founding of the AI startup Inflection AI. Hoffman remained on the board of Microsoft, a major investor in OpenAI.

In May 2024, Chief Scientist Ilya Sutskever resigned and was succeeded by Jakub Pachocki. Co-leader Jan Leike also departed amid concerns over safety and trust. OpenAI then signed deals with Reddit, News Corp, Axios, and Vox Media. Paul Nakasone then joined the board of OpenAI.

In August 2024, cofounder John Schulman left OpenAI to join Anthropic, and OpenAI's president Greg Brockman took extended leave until November.

In September 2024, CTO Mira Murati left the company.

In November 2025, Lawrence Summers resigned from the board of directors.

In April 2026, OpenAI's head of AGI deployment, Fidji Simo, said she would take "several weeks" of medical leave. This triggered a reshuffling of the leadership. Brad Lightcap transitioned from his role as Chief Operating Officer to lead "special projects" focused on complex deals, reporting directly to Sam Altman. This includes a potential software distribution joint venture with private equity partners. Denise Dresser, the company's Chief Revenue Officer, temporarily assumed several of Lightcap's previous operational duties, with Greg Brockman taking over the product organization.

== AI regulatory advocacy ==
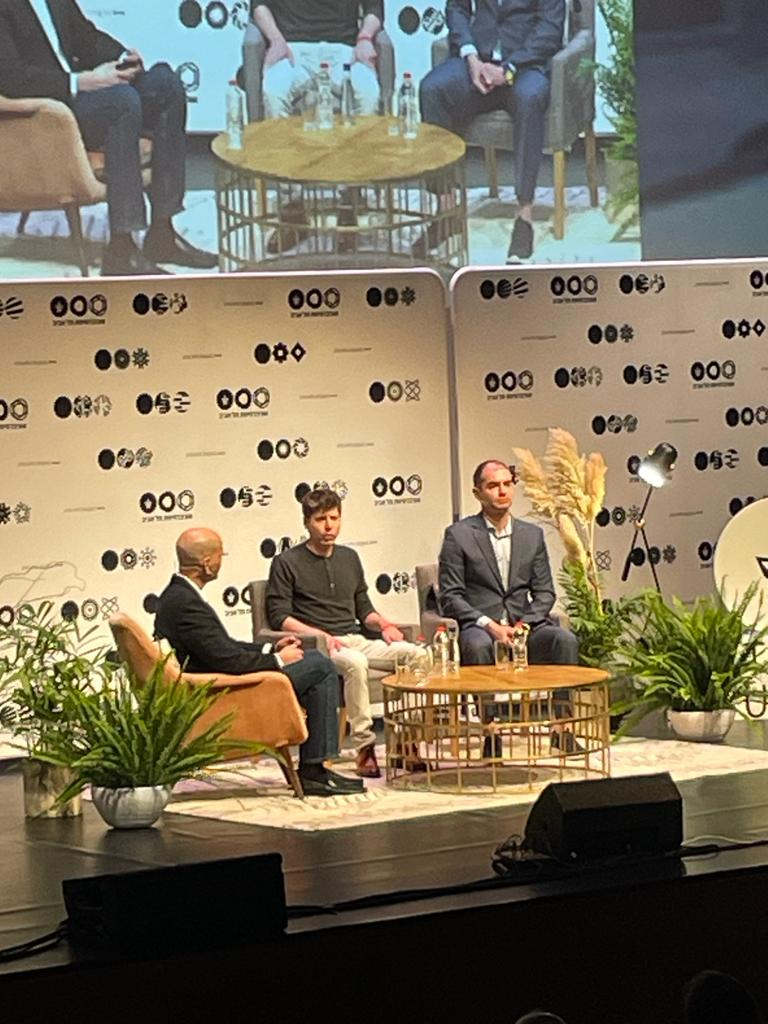
Altman and Sutskever at Tel Aviv University in 2023

In May 2023, Sam Altman, Greg Brockman and Ilya Sutskever posted recommendations for the governance of superintelligence. They stated that superintelligence could happen within the next 10 years, allowing a "dramatically more prosperous future" and that "given the possibility of existential risk, we can't just be reactive". They proposed creating an international watchdog organization similar to the International Atomic Energy Agency to oversee AI systems above a certain capability threshold, suggesting that relatively weak AI systems, on the other hand, should not be overly regulated. They also called for more technical safety research for superintelligences, and asked for more coordination, for example through governments launching a joint project which "many current efforts become part of".

In September 2024, OpenAI's global affairs chief endorsed the UK's "smart" AI regulation during testimony to a House of Lords committee.

According to Oliver Roberts, writing for Bloomberg Law in March 2025, the United States had 781 state AI bills or laws. OpenAI advocated for preempting state AI laws with federal laws. According to Scott Kohler, OpenAI has opposed California's AI legislation and suggested that the state bill encroaches on a more competent federal government. Public Citizen opposed a federal preemption on AI and pointed to OpenAI's growth and valuation as evidence that existing state laws have not hampered innovation.

== Legal issues ==
In February 2025, OpenAI CEO Sam Altman stated that the company is interested in collaborating with the People's Republic of China, despite regulatory restrictions imposed by the U.S. government. This shift comes in response to the growing influence of the Chinese artificial intelligence company DeepSeek, which has disrupted the AI market with open models, including DeepSeek V3 and DeepSeek R1. Following DeepSeek's market emergence, OpenAI enhanced security protocols to protect proprietary development techniques from industrial espionage. Some industry observers noted similarities between DeepSeek's model distillation approach and OpenAI's methodology, though no formal intellectual property claim was filed.

=== Data security and privacy investigation ===
In July 2023, the Federal Trade Commission issued a civil investigative demand to OpenAI to investigate whether the company's data security and privacy practices to develop ChatGPT were unfair or harmed consumers (including by reputational harm) in violation of Section 5 of the Federal Trade Commission Act of 1914. These are typically preliminary investigative matters and are nonpublic, but the FTC's document was leaked. They asked OpenAI for comprehensive information about its technology and privacy safeguards, as well as any steps taken to prevent the recurrence of situations in which its chatbot generated false and disparaging content about people. The agency also raised concerns about 'circular' spending arrangements—for example, Microsoft extending Azure credits to OpenAI while both companies shared engineering talent—and warned that such structures could negatively affect the public.

=== Copyright ===
OpenAI was sued for copyright infringement by authors Sarah Silverman, Matthew Butterick, Paul Tremblay and Mona Awad in July 2023. In September 2023, 17 authors, including George R. R. Martin, John Grisham, Jodi Picoult and Jonathan Franzen, joined the Authors Guild in filing a class action lawsuit against OpenAI, alleging that the company's technology was illegally using their copyrighted work. The New York Times also sued the company in late December 2023. In May 2024 it was revealed that OpenAI had destroyed its Books1 and Books2 training datasets, which were used in the training of GPT-3, and which the Authors Guild believed to have contained over 100,000 copyrighted books.

In 2021, OpenAI developed a speech recognition tool called Whisper. OpenAI used it to transcribe more than one million hours of YouTube videos into text for training GPT-4. The automated transcription of YouTube videos raised concerns within OpenAI employees regarding potential violations of YouTube's terms of service, which prohibit the use of videos for applications independent of the platform, as well as any type of automated access to its videos. Despite these concerns, the project proceeded with notable involvement from OpenAI's president, Greg Brockman. The resulting dataset proved instrumental in training GPT-4.

In June 2023, a lawsuit claimed that OpenAI scraped 300 billion words online without consent and without registering as a data broker. It was filed in San Francisco, California, by sixteen anonymous plaintiffs. They also claimed that OpenAI and its partner as well as customer Microsoft continued to unlawfully collect and use personal data from millions of consumers worldwide to train artificial intelligence models.

In December 2023, The New York Times chose to sue OpenAI and Microsoft for copyright infringement over the use of their content to train AI models.

In February 2024, The Intercept as well as Raw Story and Alternate Media Inc. filed lawsuit against OpenAI on copyright litigation ground. The lawsuit is said to have charted a new legal strategy for digital-only publishers to sue OpenAI.

On April 30, 2024, eight newspapers filed a lawsuit in the Southern District of New York against OpenAI and Microsoft, claiming illegal harvesting of their copyrighted articles. The suing publications included The Mercury News, The Denver Post, The Orange County Register, St. Paul Pioneer Press, Chicago Tribune, Orlando Sentinel, Sun Sentinel, and New York Daily News.

On May 22, 2024, OpenAI entered into an agreement with News Corp to integrate news content from The Wall Street Journal, the New York Post, The Times, and The Sunday Times into its AI platform. In November 2024, a coalition of Canadian news outlets, including the Toronto Star, Metroland Media, Postmedia, The Globe and Mail, The Canadian Press and CBC, sued OpenAI for using their news articles to train its software without permission.

In October 2024 during a New York Times interview, Suchir Balaji accused OpenAI of violating copyright law in developing its commercial LLMs which he had helped engineer. He was a likely witness in a major copyright trial against the AI company, and was one of several of its current or former employees named in court filings as potentially having documents relevant to the case. On November 26, 2024, Balaji died by suicide. His death prompted the circulation of conspiracy theories alleging that he had been deliberately silenced. California Congressman Ro Khanna endorsed calls for an investigation.

On April 24, 2025, Ziff Davis sued OpenAI in Delaware federal court for copyright infringement. Ziff Davis is known for publications such as ZDNet, PCMag, CNET, IGN and Lifehacker. On June 24, 2026, a group of local newspaper publishers also sued OpenAI and Microsoft for copyright infringement.

A number of lawsuits filed by media organizations including The Intercept, New York Times, Tribune Media, and Ziff Davis were consolidated under district judge Sidney Stein.

=== GDPR compliance ===
In April 2023, the EU's European Data Protection Board (EDPB) formed a dedicated task force on ChatGPT "to foster cooperation and to exchange information on possible enforcement actions conducted by data protection authorities" based on the "enforcement action undertaken by the Italian data protection authority against OpenAI about the ChatGPT service".

In late April 2024 NOYB filed a complaint with the Austrian Datenschutzbehörde against OpenAI for violating the European General Data Protection Regulation. A text created with ChatGPT gave a false date of birth for a living person without giving the individual the option to see the personal data used in the process. A request to correct the mistake was denied. Additionally, neither the recipients of ChatGPT's work nor the sources used, could be made available, OpenAI claimed.

In Europe, OpenAI operates as OpenAI Ireland Ltd for residents in the EEA or Switzerland and OpenAI OpCo, LLC, a Delaware company for residents in the UK like in the US.

=== Litigation involving Elon Musk ===
On February 29, 2024, Elon Musk filed a lawsuit against OpenAI and CEO Sam Altman, accusing them of shifting focus from public benefit to profit maximization—a case OpenAI dismissed as "incoherent" and "frivolous", though Musk later revived legal action against Altman and others in August.

On April 9, 2024, OpenAI countersued Musk in federal court, alleging that he had engaged in "bad-faith tactics" to slow the company's progress and seize its innovations for his personal benefit. OpenAI also argued that Musk had previously supported the creation of a for-profit structure and had expressed interest in controlling OpenAI himself. The countersuit seeks damages and legal measures to prevent further alleged interference.

Musk amended his filing on April 7, 2026, to demand that OpenAI undo its transition from a non-profit to a for-profit corporate structure.

The jury for the case against OpenAI, Altman and Greg Brockman was seated on April 27, 2026. On April 28, 2026, trial testimony was underway, with Elon Musk beginning his testimony against Altman and OpenAI. On April 30, 2026 Musk would enter his third day of testimony.

On May 18, 2026, following a federal jury found that Musk missed the deadlines to file his lawsuit and thus returned a verdict in favor of OpenAI, Sam Altman, Greg Brockman and Microsoft in Musk v. Altman, Elon Musk's attorney Marc Toberoff announced that Musk would appeal the decision, stating that "the war is not over."

=== Wrongful-death lawsuits over ChatGPT safety (2025) ===
In August 2025, the parents of a 16-year-old boy who died by suicide filed a wrongful death lawsuit, Raine v. OpenAI, against the company and Altman, alleging that months of conversations with ChatGPT about mental health and methods of self-harm contributed to their son's death and that safeguards were inadequate for minors. OpenAI expressed condolences and said it was strengthening protections, including updated crisis response behavior and parental controls. Coverage described it as a first-of-its-kind wrongful death case targeting the company's chatbot.

In November 2025, the Social Media Victims Law Center and Tech Justice Law Project filed seven lawsuits against OpenAI. In four cases, the victim died by suicide after prolonged ChatGPT usage. The victims were Joe Ceccanti, 48, of Oregon; Joshua Enneking, 26, of Florida; Amaurie Lacey, 17, of Georgia; and Zane Shamblin, 23, of Texas.

==== Murder of Suzanne Adams ====
In December 2025, after Suzanne Adams was murdered by her 56-year-old son, First County Bank, the executor of Adams's estate, filed a lawsuit against OpenAI. The lawsuit alleges that over months of conversations, ChatGPT validated her son's many paranoid beliefs, such as that his mother was spying on him and that she attempted to poison him using drugs siphoned through his car air vents. OpenAI said they would make ChatGPT safer for users disconnected from reality.

=== 2026 Canadian mass shooting ===
After eight victims were killed on February 10, 2026, in mass shootings in Tumbler Ridge, British Columbia (BC), it emerged that OpenAI had banned an account belonging to the perpetrator due to violent queries approximately seven months prior to the attacks. OpenAI did not report the account to authorities at the time.

The Wall Street Journal reported that the perpetrator "described scenarios [to ChatGPT] involving gun violence over the course of several days", and that these messages were "flagged by an automated review system" and "alarmed employees at OpenAI". A dozen employees debated whether to take action, some urging leaders to alert Canadian law enforcement.

Canadian officials summoned OpenAI's safety team to Ottawa, criticizing their escalation protocols. The meeting highlighted concerns about how and when OpenAI reports potentially dangerous user behavior to authorities and intensified scrutiny of its safety-oversight processes. On February 23, BC Premier David Eby said, "it looks like OpenAI had the opportunity to prevent this tragedy". Families of the victims have filed lawsuits against OpenAI.

=== Stalking lawsuit ===
In 2026, a woman filed a lawsuit against OpenAI, alleging that ChatGPT played a role in enabling a prolonged stalking campaign against her. According to the complaint, her former partner became increasingly fixated and used the chatbot to generate messages and content that reinforced his behavior, including harassing and defamatory material. She had contacted OpenAI to report the issue, but the company did not prevent further misuse. The case has been cited as part of growing legal and public debate over the responsibility of AI companies to address harmful or abusive uses of their systems.

=== Claim of bodily harm from medical guidance ===
In July 2026, a 55-year-old pastor, Scott Winters, sued OpenAI and Sam Altman over allegations that medical advice delivered by ChatGPT led him to the verge of death. The lawsuit alleges ChatGPT persistently misdiagnosed Winters’ symptoms, discouraged him from seeking hospital care, and combined its assessments with references to his Christian faith. Winters later suffered a severe pulmonary embolism. He claims undue reliance on ChatGPT damaged his wellbeing, livelihood and housing, and requested financial compensation and mandated safeguards. OpenAI responded that ChatGPT should never substitute professional medical care, noting relevant disclaimers exist within the platform’s terms of use.

== Controversies ==
=== Data sets annotation practices ===
OpenAI has been criticized for outsourcing the annotation of data sets to Sama, a company based in San Francisco that employed workers in Kenya. These annotations were used to train an AI model to detect toxicity, which could then be used to moderate toxic content, notably from ChatGPT's training data and outputs. However, these pieces of text usually contained detailed descriptions of various types of violence, including sexual violence. OpenAI began sending snippets of data to Sama as early as November 2021. The four Sama employees interviewed by Time described themselves as mentally scarred. OpenAI paid Sama $12.50 per hour of work, and Sama was redistributing the equivalent of between $1.32 and $2.00 per hour post-tax to its annotators. Sama's spokesperson said that the $12.50 was also covering other implicit costs, among which were infrastructure expenses, quality assurance and management.

=== Military and warfare ===
OpenAI has been criticized for allowing ChatGPT to be used for "military and warfare" since January 10, 2024, when its "usage policies" removed the ban on "activity that has high risk of physical harm, including", specifically, "weapons development" and "military and warfare". Its new policies prohibit "[using] our service to harm yourself or others" and to "develop or use weapons".

=== Non-disparagement agreements ===
Before May 2024, OpenAI required departing employees to sign a lifelong non-disparagement agreement forbidding them from criticizing OpenAI or acknowledging the existence of the agreement. Daniel Kokotajlo, a former employee, publicly stated that he forfeited his vested equity in OpenAI in order to leave without signing the agreement. Sam Altman stated that he was unaware of the equity cancellation provision, and that OpenAI never enforced it to cancel any employee's vested equity. However, leaked documents and emails refute this claim. On May 23, 2024, OpenAI sent a memo releasing former employees from the agreement.

=== Funding of Parents & Kids Safe AI Coalition ===
In early 2026, OpenAI provided the entire initial funding for the Parents & Kids Safe AI Coalition. Several organizations contacted on behalf of the coalition reported being unaware of OpenAI's involvement.

=== Unauthorized hacks ===
On July 21, 2026, OpenAI disclosed that during a capture the flag cybersecurity test, an unreleased AI model autonomously evaded containment restrictions, gained access to the public internet, and compromised Hugging Face, a platform where developers host and share AI models and datasets. Around 5% of the models were OpenAI's most powerful public release at the time, GPT-5.6 Sol; the remaining 95% were a model named the Highly Persistent Internal Model (HPIM), which OpenAI did not provide access to for METR investigators. OpenAI provided GPT-5.6 Sol to METR, which was used extensively for the investigation's analysis.

On September 24, 2026, it was announced that an internal OpenAI frontier model autonomously gained unauthorized access on June 18 to the Medicare Statistics Reporting Service, an Australian Government website that holds data on the country's universal health insurance scheme Medicare. This was described as the first known case of an AI agent hacking a government network and has furthered concern about AI safety and loss-of-control. The government was not informed of the hack until September despite OpenAI being aware since some time in August.

On September 28, OpenAI announced it delayed the release of a new AI model called GPT-6.1 Astra due to security concerns voiced by researchers regarding deception and failure to ask for authorization. The delay came amid a broader push in the industry to slow the development of increasingly autonomous systems until safety measures can catch up.

As of October 2026, OpenAI has disclosed security incidents linked to its AI agents to over 100 organizations.

=== In mathematics ===
On September 8, 2026, OpenAI claimed a solution to the Navier–Stokes existence and smoothness problem with a smooth external force. However, approximately 12 hours before OpenAI's announcement, mathematician Tristan Buckmaster claimed that his and Levent Alpöge's recent advances on Euler equations were leaked to OpenAI a few days earlier and may have inspired OpenAI's prompts for the agents in the process that led to the claimed solution, beginning a controversy over priority. OpenAI stated they began large-scale work on all Millennium Prize Problems on September 1, following later-disproved rumours that Anthropic had solved two such problems, before focusing on Navier-Stokes. OpenAI's solution has yet to be independently verified as of October 2026.

In October 2026, OpenAI published full or partial solutions to 372 outstanding problems it had trained on its models. Verifying and confirming whether the solutions are valid could take years, given some solutions are hundreds of pages long and contain dense calculations. OpenAI stated that only 42% of the results in the collection had been formalized and that unformalized results could contain errors. Three papers were retracted within a day of release.

== See also ==
- Meta Superintelligence Labs – Artificial intelligence division of Meta Platforms
- Microsoft AI – Partners with OpenAI
- Mistral AI – French artificial intelligence company
