= Meta Superintelligence Labs =

Artificial intelligence division of Meta Platforms

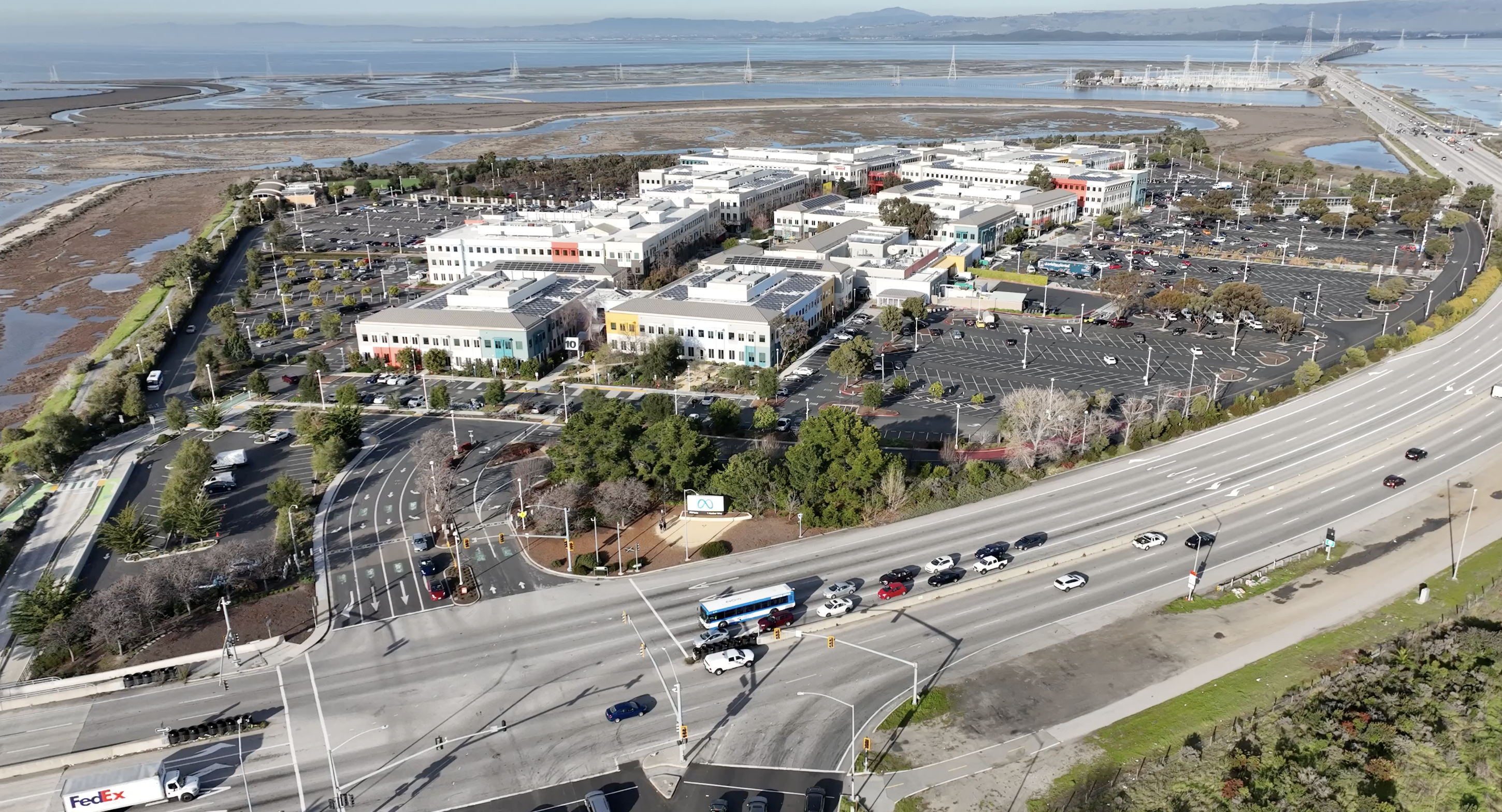
- Meta's headquarters in Menlo Park, California
- Type: Division
- Industry: Artificial intelligence
- Founded: June 30, 2025; 16 months ago
- Headquarters: Menlo Park, California, U.S.
- Key people: Alexandr Wang (chief AI officer)
- Products: Muse Spark; Muse Wonder; Llama
- Services: Meta AI; Muse; Moltbook
- Number of employees: 3,000 (2025)
- Parent: Meta Platforms
- Subsidiaries: Scale AI (49%)
- Website: ai.meta.com

Meta Superintelligence Labs (MSL) is an American artificial intelligence division of Meta Platforms, headquartered in Menlo Park, California, founded in June 2025. The division focuses on research and development in the field of artificial superintelligence. MSL produces the Muse family of generative AI models, including the Muse AI agent, the Muse Spark large language model (LLM), Muse Image and Muse Video.

MSL was preceded by Facebook Artificial Intelligence Research (FAIR), directed by Yann LeCun. In 2017 FAIR released PyTorch, an open source deep learning framework later used by ChatGPT, Tesla Autopilot, Uber's Pyro, and Hugging Face's Transformers. When Meta rebranded in 2021, FAIR was renamed Fundamental Artificial Intelligence Research, and Meta AI was formed. From 2023 to 2025, Meta released four iterations of the Llama LLM.

In June 2025, Meta began developing a larger model codenamed Behemoth, reportedly motivated by CEO Mark Zuckerberg's displeasure with Llama 4. Meta spent more than $14 billion to acquire a 49% non-voting stake in Scale AI, a data annotation and language model benchmarking company. Scale AI's CEO Alexandr Wang moved to Chief AI Officer at Meta, leading MSL. Former GitHub CEO Nat Friedman joined as head of product. Meta had also unsuccessfully sought the acquisition of Safe Superintelligence Inc., Thinking Machines Lab, and Perplexity AI. In November 2025, LeCun left Meta to found Advanced Machine Intelligence Labs. Muse Spark was released in July 2026, achieving a top five result in benchmarks by Artificial Analysis.

== History ==
=== Background ===
The then-named Facebook founded a AI division in 2013 as Facebook Artificial Intelligence Research (FAIR). It has workspaces in Menlo Park, London, New York City, Paris, Seattle, Pittsburgh, Tel Aviv, and Montreal as of 2025.

In 2016, FAIR partnered with Google, Amazon, IBM, and Microsoft in creating the Partnership on Artificial Intelligence to Benefit People and Society.

FAIR was directed by Yann LeCun until 2018, when Jérôme Pesenti succeeded the role. Pesenti is formerly the CTO of IBM's big data group.

FAIR's research includes self-supervised learning, generative adversarial networks, document classification and translation, and computer vision. FAIR released Torch deep-learning modules as well as PyTorch in 2017, an open-source machine learning framework, which was subsequently used in several deep learning technologies, such as ChatGPT, Tesla Autopilot, Uber's Pyro. and Hugging Face's Transformers. That same year, a pair of chatbots were falsely rumored to be discontinued for developing a language that was unintelligible to humans. FAIR clarified that the research had been shut down because they had accomplished their initial goal to understand how languages are generated by their models, rather than out of fear.

FAIR's full name was renamed Fundamental Artificial Intelligence Research following Facebook's rebranding to Meta Platforms Inc.

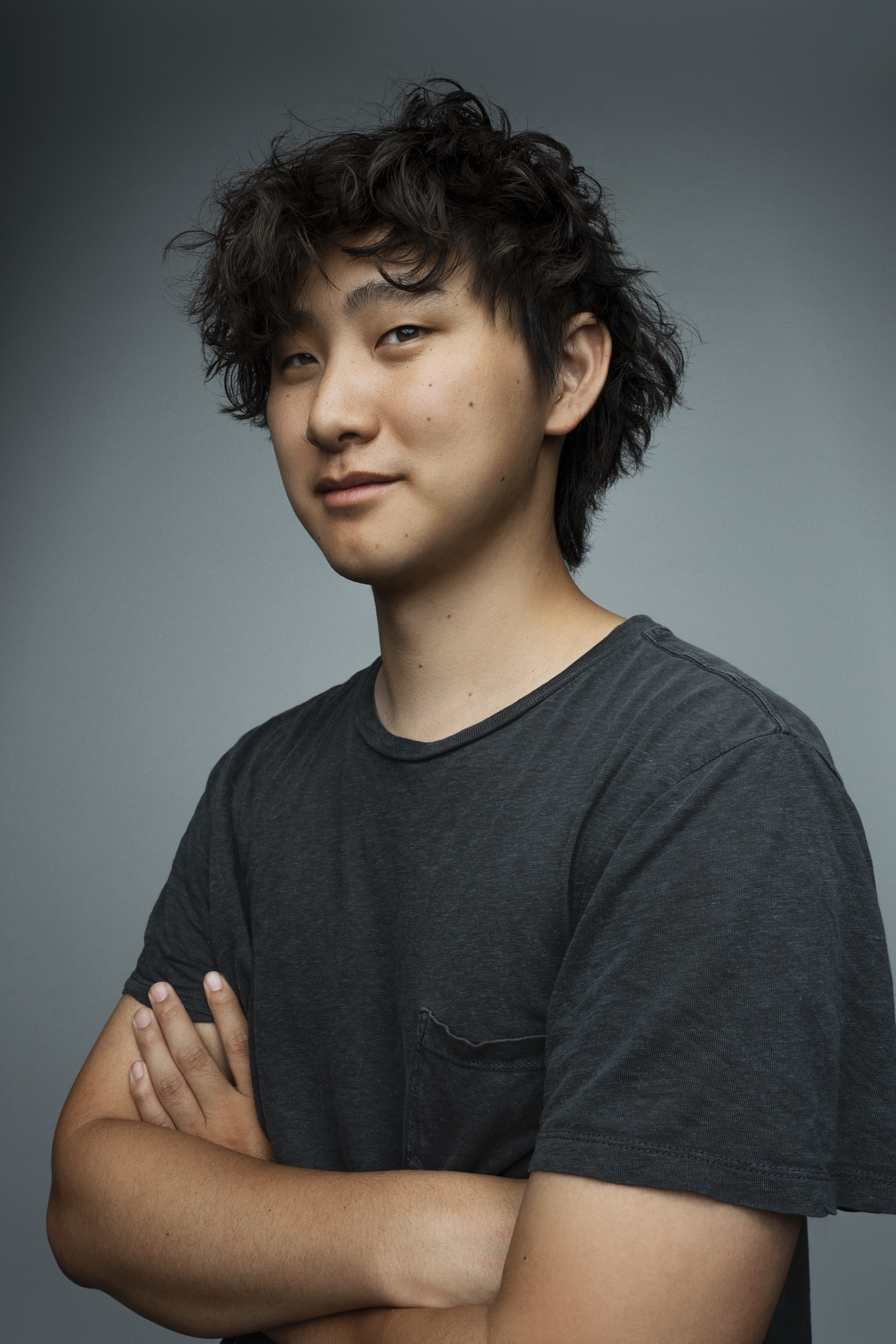
Alexandr Wang, Chief A.I. Officer at Meta since June 2025.

=== Founding ===
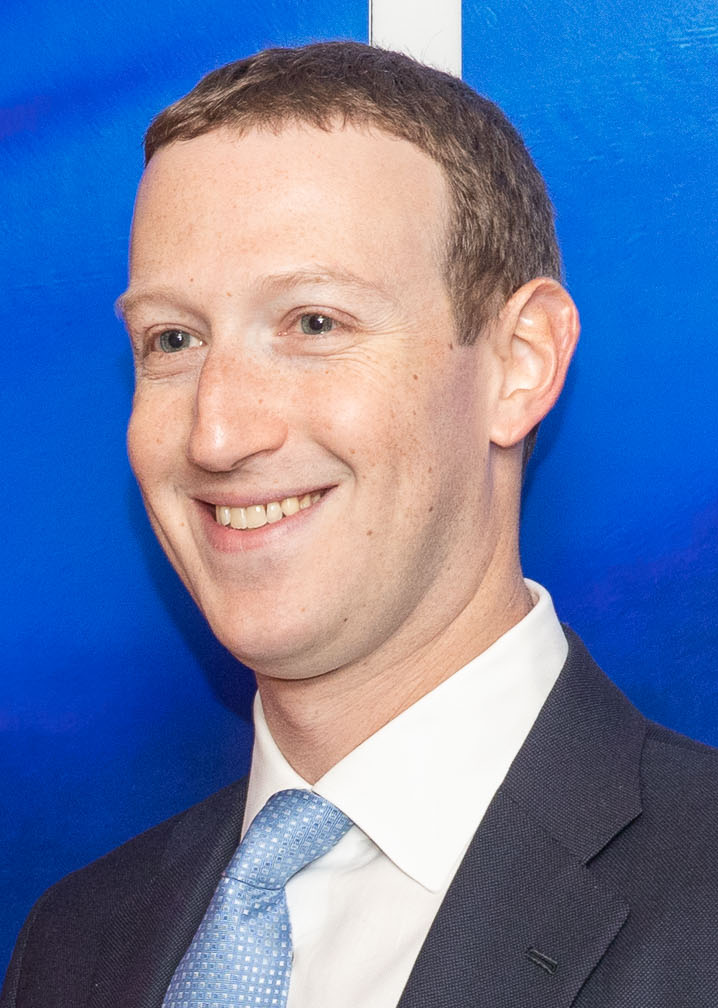
Mark Zuckerberg, the chief executive of Meta Platforms, has taken an active role in recruiting employees for Meta Superintelligence Labs.

In June 2025, Bloomberg News reported that Mark Zuckerberg, the chief executive of Meta Platforms, had expressed displeasure at Llama 4, the company's large language model released in April, tasking employees to work overtime. In response, Meta began internally developing Behemoth, a larger model set to be more sophisticated than offerings from OpenAI, Anthropic, and Google. According to The Wall Street Journal, amid concerns from Meta's leadership over Behemoth's capabilities, the company delayed the release of the model. The decision to delay Behemoth led Zuckerberg to involve himself closely with Meta's AI efforts, starting a WhatsApp group chat with senior leadership to recruit researchers. According to Bloomberg News, Zuckerberg set a goal to hire approximately fifty people to staff a firm to achieve artificial general intelligence.

That month, Zuckerberg sought to invest several billion dollars into Scale AI and hire its chief executive and founder, Alexandr Wang. In addition, he had personally recruited researchers at his homes in Lake Tahoe and Palo Alto, California; The New York Times later reported that Zuckerberg had offered compensation packages valued between US$1 to US$100 million to employees at OpenAI and Google.

Days later, Meta announced that it was investing US$14.3 billion into Scale AI, an intentionally muted role despite hiring Wang in order to avoid scrutiny from the Federal Trade Commission amid an impending decision from judge James Boasberg in FTC v. Meta (2020). According to The Information, Zuckerberg was willing to provide US$5 billion, though Wang countered with US$20 billion. In order to fund the tentative firm, Meta implemented advertisements in WhatsApp. The Information later reported that Meta was discussing hiring Nat Friedman, the former chief executive of GitHub, and the businessman and investor Daniel Gross, and acquiring their venture capital firm, NFDG.

According to CNBC, Meta had sought to acquire Safe Superintelligence Inc., but its CEO Ilya Sutskever refused the acquisition. Additionally, Zuckerberg privately discussed acquiring Thinking Machines Lab and Perplexity AI, though the deals fell through over disputes concerning prices and strategy. Days later, The Verge reported that Gross and Friedman would report directly beneath Wang. Zuckerberg assumed a dominant role in hiring employees, though his efforts faced complications from researchers who expressed skepticism at Meta's artificial intelligence, uncertainty over internal restructuring, and a perceived strategic conflict with Meta's vice president for artificial intelligence, Yann LeCun. Additionally, several researchers were surprised to receive messages from Zuckerberg, including one person who, believing a message they received to be a hoax, did not respond for several days.

On June 30, Zuckerberg announced that he was establishing Meta Superintelligence Labs with Wang serving as chief AI officer and Friedman leading work on AI products. Meta AI (formerly Fundamental Artificial Intelligence Research) and several other divisions, including a new team called TBD Lab, dedicated to "developing the next generation" of Meta's large language models, were placed beneath Meta Superintelligence Labs. In an internal memo, Zuckerberg named eleven employees the company had hired. Zuckerberg's efforts forced other AI company executives, including Microsoft's Satya Nadella and OpenAI's Sam Altman, to attract researchers themselves. In July, Gross joined Superintelligence Labs as Friedman's counterpart. That month, The New York Times reported that Superintelligence Labs executives had discussed a proprietary AI model.

In August, Meta restructured Meta Superintelligence Labs into four subgroups.

On November 20, 2025, Yann LeCun left Meta's chief AI scientist role to start a new firm, Advanced Machine Intelligence Labs.

== Models ==
On April 8, 2026, Meta Superintelligence Labs released their first model Muse Spark, part of the Muse family, which now powers the Meta AI assistant. Muse Glimmer, an open-weights model with 30 billion parameters that was marketed as being operable on a personal computer, was released under the Apache License on August 10, 2026.

== Structure ==
Meta Superintelligence Labs comprises four distinct groups:

- TBD Lab: Led by Wang, this team manages Meta's large language models;
- FAIR: An artificial intelligence research team;
- Products and Applied Research: Led by Friedman, this group focuses on consumer integration;
- MSL Infra: Led by Aparna Ramani, this team develops and maintains the infrastructure required to sustain artificial intelligence models;

== FAIR Research ==
=== Natural language processing and chatbot ===
Natural language processing is the ability for machines to understand and generate natural language. The team is also researching unsupervised machine translation and multilingual chatbots.

==== Galactica ====
Galactica is a large language model (LLM) designed for generating scientific text. It was available for three days from 15 November 2022, before being withdrawn for generating racist and inaccurate content.

==== Llama ====
Llama is an LLM released in February 2023. As of January 2026, the most recent release is the Llama 4.

=== Hardware ===
Meta used CPUs and in-house custom chips before 2022; they switched to Nvidia GPUs since then. In 2026 they announced a return to using custom chips in addition to Nvidia GPUs. MTIA v1, one of their early chips, is designed for the company's content recommendation algorithms. It was fabricated on TSMC's 7 nm process technology and consumed 25W, capable of 51.2 TFlops FP16.
