= Muse AI =

Muse AI may refer to:

- Muse Spark, a large language model developed by Meta Platforms
- Muse (AI agent), an AI agent product from Meta Platforms
