= Alexander Wang =

Alexander Wang may refer to:

- Alexander Lee-Hom Wang or Wang Leehom (born 1976), Taiwanese-American musician
- Alexander Wang (designer) (born 1983), Taiwanese-American fashion designer
- Alexandr Wang (born 1997), CEO of Scale AI
