= Marshfield, Missouri =

City in Missouri, U.S.

- City
- City of Marshfield
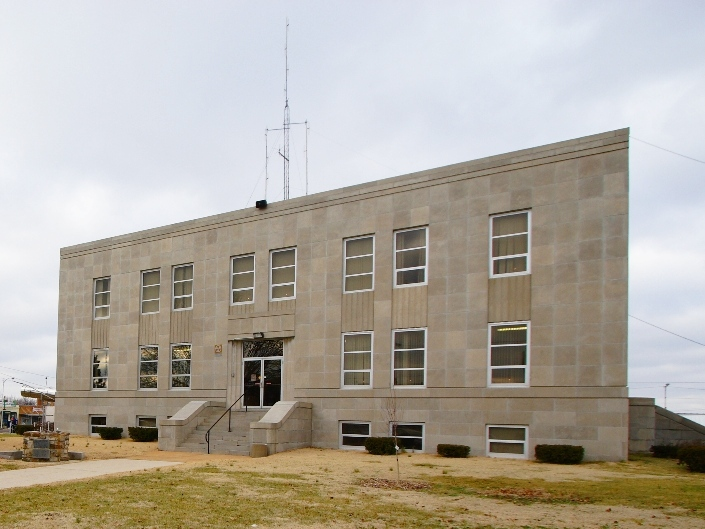
- The Webster County Courthouse in Marshfield

- Location of Marshfield, Missouri
- Coordinates: 37°20′23″N 92°54′26″W
- Country: United States
- State: Missouri
- County: Webster
- Founded: 1855
- Incorporated: 1856
- Named for: Marshfield, Massachusetts

Government
  - Mayor: Natalie McNish
  - City Administrator: Sam Rost

Area
  - Total: 5.53 sq mi (14.33 km^{2})
  - Land: 5.52 sq mi (14.30 km^{2})
  - Water: 0.012 sq mi (0.03 km^{2})
- Elevation: 1,493 ft (455 m)

Population (2020)
  - Total: 7,458
  - Estimate (2024): 7,935
  - Density: 1,351/sq mi (521.6/km^{2})
- Time zone: UTC-6 (Central (CST))
  - Summer (DST): UTC-5 (CDT)
- ZIP code: 65706
- Area code: 417
- FIPS code: 29-46388
- GNIS feature ID: 0721909
- Website: marshfieldmo.gov

Marshfield is a city in and the county seat of Webster County, Missouri, United States. As of the 2020 census, Marshfield had a population of 7,458. As of 2024, the population is estimated to be 7,935. It is part of the Springfield metropolitan area.

== History ==
Marshfield was platted in 1855, taking its name from Marshfield, Massachusetts. A post office called Marshfield has been in operation since 1856. Marshfield is the county seat of Webster County and sits on land donated by William T. Burford and C.F. Dryden.

The Hosmer Dairy Farm Historic District and Rainey Funeral Home Building are listed on the National Register of Historic Places.

Marshfield is home to the only intersection of the TransAmerica Bicycle Trail and U.S. Route 66.

Marshfield is the hometown of Edwin Hubble. A replica of the Hubble Space Telescope can be found in front of the Webster County Court House at 100 S Clay St.

In the evening hours of April 18, 1880, a powerful, destructive, F4 tornado impacted the heart of the city. The tornado is the 16th deadliest tornado in the United States history, and is the second-deadliest tornado in Missouri's history.

== Demographics ==
Historical population
Census	Pop.	Note	%±
1860	408		—
1870	809		98.3%
1880	655		−19.0%
1890	980		49.6%
1900	964		−1.6%
1910	1,193		23.8%
1920	1,371		14.9%
1930	1,378		0.5%
1940	1,764		28.0%
1950	1,925		9.1%
1960	2,221		15.4%
1970	2,961		33.3%
1980	3,871		30.7%
1990	4,374		13.0%
2000	5,720		30.8%
2010	6,633		16.0%
2020	7,458		12.4%
U.S. Decennial Census

=== 2020 census ===
As of the 2020 census, Marshfield had a population of 7,458. The median age was 35.7 years. 26.6% of residents were under the age of 18 and 17.6% of residents were 65 years of age or older. For every 100 females there were 89.4 males, and for every 100 females age 18 and over there were 85.1 males age 18 and over.

97.3% of residents lived in urban areas, while 2.7% lived in rural areas.

There were 2,939 households in Marshfield, of which 34.0% had children under the age of 18 living in them. Of all households, 46.6% were married-couple households, 16.1% were households with a male householder and no spouse or partner present, and 30.6% were households with a female householder and no spouse or partner present. About 30.4% of all households were made up of individuals and 14.7% had someone living alone who was 65 years of age or older. There were 1,716 families living in the city.

There were 3,179 housing units, of which 7.5% were vacant. The homeowner vacancy rate was 2.6% and the rental vacancy rate was 7.0%. The population density was 1,351.1 inhabitants per square mile (521.7/km^{2}), and the housing unit density was 575.9 per square mile (222.4/km^{2}).

Racial composition as of the 2020 census
Race	Number	Percent
White	6,822	91.5%
Black or African American	43	0.6%
American Indian and Alaska Native	77	1.0%
Asian	32	0.4%
Native Hawaiian and Other Pacific Islander	4	0.1%
Some other race	59	0.8%
Two or more races	421	5.6%
Hispanic or Latino (of any race)	185	2.5%

=== 2010 census ===
At the 2010 census, 6,633 people, 2,605 households, and 1,756 families were living in the city. The population density was 1,318.7 inhabitants per square mile (509.2/km^{2}). The 2,918 housing units had an average density of 580.1 per square mile (224.0/km^{2}). The racial makeup of the city was 96.5% White, 0.4% African American, 0.8% Native American, 0.2% Asian, 0.5% from other races, and 1.7% from two or more races. Hispanics or Latinos of any race were 1.7%.

Of the 2,605 households, 37.0% had children under 18 living with them, 49.0% were married couples living together, 14.0% had a female householder with no husband present, 4.4% had a male householder with no wife present, and 32.6% were not families. About 28.9% of households were one person, and 14.8% were one person 65 or older. The average household size was 2.47, and the average family size was 3.04.

The median age was 36.4 years. The city's age distribution was 27.6% under 18, 8.5% between 18 and 24; 24.3% from 25 to 44; 21.9% from 45 to 64; and 17.7% 65 or older. The gender makeup of the city was 47.1% male and 52.9% female.

=== 2000 census ===
At the 2000 census, 5,720 people, 2,256 households, and 1,534 families resided in the city. The population density was 1,182.7 inhabitants per square mile (456.6/km^{2}). The 2,417 housing units had an average density of 499.8 per square mile (193.0/km^{2}). The racial makeup of the city was 97.80% White, 0.19% African American, 0.42% Native American, 0.30% Asian, 0.12% from other races, and 1.17% from two or more races. Hispanics or Latinos of any race were 1.75%.

Of the 2,256 households. 34.7% had children under 18 living with them, 53.2% were married couples living together, 11.4% had a female householder with no husband present, and 32.0% were not families. About 28.7% of households were one person, and 16.0% were one person 65 or older. The average household size was 2.44, and the average family size was 3.00.

The age distribution was 27.1% under 18, 9.4% from 18 to 24, 27.2% from 25 to 44, 18.2% from 45 to 64, and 18.1% 65 or older. The median age was 35 years. For every 100 females, there were 85.0 males. For every 100 females age 18 and over, there were 79.3 males.

As of 2000, The median household income was $27,753, and the median family income was $36,090. Males had a median income of $27,813 versus $20,752 for females. The per capita income for the city was $14,855. About 5.5% of families and 11.6% of the population were below the poverty line, including 10.2% of those under age 18 and 12.2% of those age 65 or over.

== Geography ==
Marshfield is located at 37°20′23″N 92°54′26″W (37.339599, -92.907230). According to the United States Census Bureau, the city has a total area of 5.03 square miles (13.03 km^{2}), all land.

=== Climate ===
Marshfield has a humid subtropical climate (Köppen climate classification Cfa), with elements of a humid continental climate. The city experiences four distinct seasons; summers are warm and humid, while winters are cool with occasional cold spells. Rainfall is highest in the late spring. Snowfall is generally light, with an average of 5.2 inches (13 cm).

Climate data for Marshfield, Missouri (1991–2020 normals, extremes 1908–present)
Month	Jan	Feb	Mar	Apr	May	Jun	Jul	Aug	Sep	Oct	Nov	Dec	Year
Record high °F (°C)	76 (24)	83 (28)	92 (33)	91 (33)	95 (35)	102 (39)	110 (43)	104 (40)	106 (41)	94 (34)	84 (29)	81 (27)	110 (43)
Mean maximum °F (°C)	66.0 (18.9)	70.8 (21.6)	78.0 (25.6)	83.9 (28.8)	87.8 (31.0)	91.7 (33.2)	95.9 (35.5)	96.9 (36.1)	92.1 (33.4)	84.0 (28.9)	74.3 (23.5)	66.3 (19.1)	98.2 (36.8)
Mean daily maximum °F (°C)	42.2 (5.7)	47.3 (8.5)	57.0 (13.9)	67.3 (19.6)	75.4 (24.1)	83.6 (28.7)	87.9 (31.1)	87.2 (30.7)	79.9 (26.6)	68.6 (20.3)	55.8 (13.2)	45.6 (7.6)	66.5 (19.2)
Daily mean °F (°C)	31.9 (−0.1)	36.3 (2.4)	45.5 (7.5)	55.5 (13.1)	64.6 (18.1)	73.1 (22.8)	77.5 (25.3)	76.4 (24.7)	68.7 (20.4)	57.3 (14.1)	45.1 (7.3)	35.8 (2.1)	55.6 (13.1)
Mean daily minimum °F (°C)	21.5 (−5.8)	25.2 (−3.8)	34.0 (1.1)	43.7 (6.5)	53.9 (12.2)	62.7 (17.1)	67.0 (19.4)	65.6 (18.7)	57.5 (14.2)	46.0 (7.8)	34.4 (1.3)	26.0 (−3.3)	44.8 (7.1)
Mean minimum °F (°C)	2.9 (−16.2)	7.9 (−13.4)	16.1 (−8.8)	29.1 (−1.6)	39.0 (3.9)	51.9 (11.1)	58.6 (14.8)	56.1 (13.4)	43.0 (6.1)	30.6 (−0.8)	18.3 (−7.6)	8.3 (−13.2)	−0.9 (−18.3)
Record low °F (°C)	−20 (−29)	−17 (−27)	−7 (−22)	19 (−7)	29 (−2)	41 (5)	47 (8)	45 (7)	31 (−1)	18 (−8)	3 (−16)	−18 (−28)	−20 (−29)
Average precipitation inches (mm)	2.65 (67)	2.47 (63)	3.73 (95)	4.72 (120)	5.54 (141)	4.64 (118)	4.45 (113)	3.35 (85)	4.15 (105)	3.50 (89)	3.64 (92)	2.81 (71)	45.65 (1,160)
Average snowfall inches (cm)	1.7 (4.3)	0.6 (1.5)	0.6 (1.5)	0.0 (0.0)	0.0 (0.0)	0.0 (0.0)	0.0 (0.0)	0.0 (0.0)	0.0 (0.0)	0.0 (0.0)	0.1 (0.25)	2.2 (5.6)	5.2 (13)
Average precipitation days (≥ 0.01 in)	7.9	7.4	10.3	10.7	12.5	10.3	9.6	8.9	8.1	8.7	8.5	7.4	110.3
Average snowy days (≥ 0.1 in)	1.2	1.1	0.2	0.0	0.0	0.0	0.0	0.0	0.0	0.0	0.1	0.7	3.3
Source: NOAA

== Education ==
Marshfield has one public high school, Marshfield High School. Marshfield Christian School is a private institution.

Marshfield has a lending library, which is a branch of the Webster County Library.

== Government ==
As of June 2021, the mayor of Marshfield is Natalie B. McNish and the city administrator is Sam Rost.

== Culture ==
Founded in 2005, the Missouri Cherry Blossom Festival is an annual three-day event that takes place in late April. Visitors to the festival can purchase crafts and food from vendors in the town square. Activities are available for the whole family, and notable speakers are invited to provide both entertainment and education. Descendants of Presidents are invited to attend and typically speak at the Presidential forum. Additionally, entertainers from television, music, and film are available at the Nostalgia Fest Autograph Show typically taking place on the Friday and Saturday of the festival.

== Notable people ==
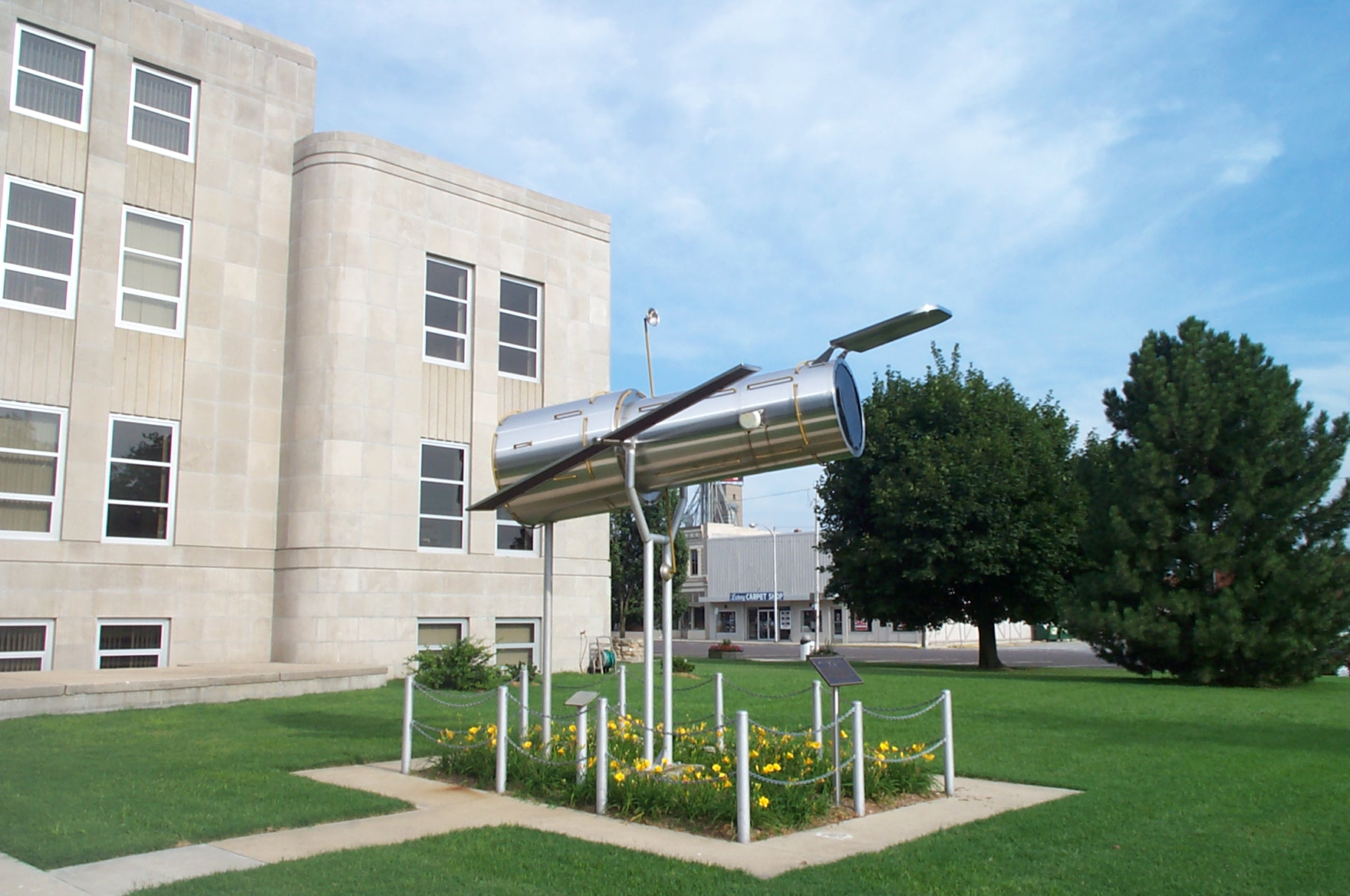
A 1/4 scale model of the Hubble Space Telescope located at the courthouse in Marshfield.

- Dan Hendrycks, director of the Center for AI Safety
- Dan Clemens, Republican member of the Missouri State Senate
- Joe Haymes, Swing Era orchestra leader
- Edwin Hubble, American astronomer - part of Interstate 44 through Marshfield is named the Edwin Hubble Highway.
- Darren King, member of the band Mutemath

== See also ==
- List of cities in Missouri
