= Hosmer Dairy Farm Historic District =

Historic district in Missouri, United States

- U.S. National Register of Historic Places
- U.S. Historic district
- Location within Missouri Location within the United States
- Location: County Farm Road 522, approximately 0.5 miles southwest of its junction with Route E, near Marshfield, Missouri
- Coordinates: 37°21′33″N 93°1′40″W
- Area: 2 acres (0.81 ha)
- Built: c. 1900
- Built by: Unknown
- Architectural style: bank barn
- NRHP reference No.: 96000549
- Added to NRHP: May 16, 1996

Hosmer Dairy Farm Historic District, also known as Walnut Springs Farm, is a historic dairy farm and national historic district located near Marshfield, Missouri, United States. The district contains two contributing buildings: a dairy barn (c. 1900) with two attached silos and horse barn (c. 1900). The dairy barn is a frame bank barn on a limestone block foundation.

It was listed on the National Register of Historic Places in 1996.
