= Meta AI =

Artificial intelligence division of Meta Platforms

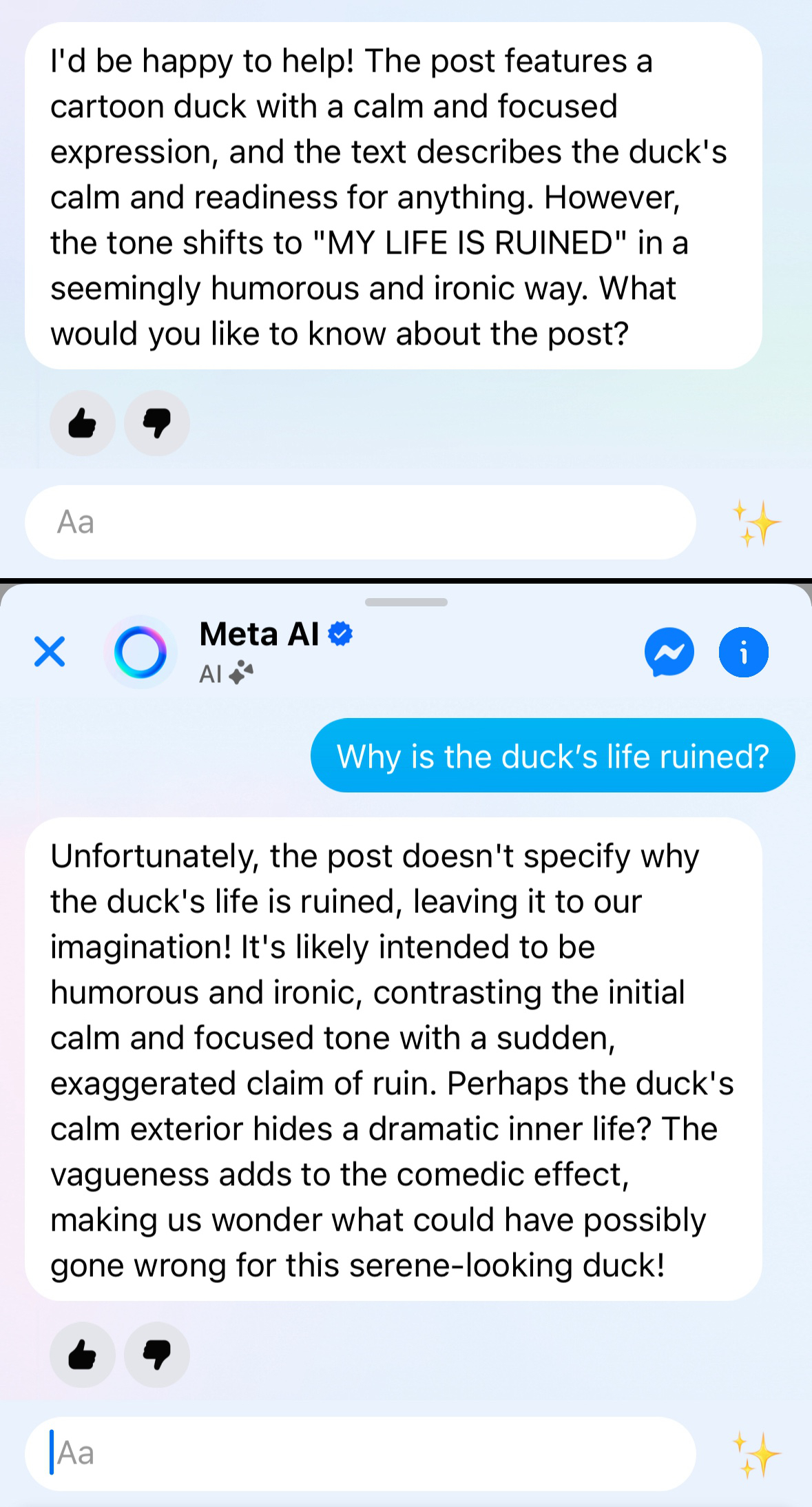
- Type: Division
- Industry: Artificial intelligence
- Founded: 2013; 13 years ago
- Founders: Rob Fergus; Yann LeCun; Serkan Piantino; Mark Zuckerberg
- Headquarters: Astor Place, New York City, U.S.
- Products: Llama; Muse; Muse Spark
- Owner: Meta Platforms
- Website: ai.meta.com

Meta AI is a research division of Meta (formerly Facebook) that develops artificial intelligence and augmented reality technologies. It has workspaces in Menlo Park, London, New York City, Paris, Seattle, Pittsburgh, Tel Aviv, and Montreal as of 2025.

== History ==
Meta AI was founded in 2013 as Facebook AI Research (FAIR). FAIR was directed by Yann LeCun until 2018, when Jérôme Pesenti succeeded him.

FAIR's research has included self-supervised learning, generative adversarial networks, document classification and translation, and computer vision.

In 2016, FAIR released fastText, an open-source library for efficient text classification and learning word representations, which introduced methods based on character n-grams.

In 2017, FAIR released Torch deep-learning modules and PyTorch, an open-source machine learning framework that became widely adopted in deep learning research and industry.

Following the 2021 rebranding of Facebook, Inc. as Meta Platforms, FAIR continued as Meta's Fundamental AI Research (FAIR) team.

The French media outlet Mediapart reported that in 2022, Facebook's parent company illegally used works accumulated by the pirate site LibGen for AI training.

In 2023, Meta introduced Meta AI assistant based on the company's Llama models and integrated into products.

In 2025, Meta reorganized its artificial intelligence efforts under Meta Superintelligence Labs, which brought together FAIR, large language model development teams, and other AI research and product groups.

== Virtual assistant ==
Meta AI is also the name of the virtual assistant developed by the team, now integrated as a chatbot into Meta's social networking products. It is also available as a stand-alone app, with optional paid subscriptions providing higher usage limits.

The virtual assistant was pre-installed on the second generation of Ray-Ban Meta smartglasses, and can incorporate inputs from the glasses' cameras after an update. It is also available on Quest 2 and newer HMDs.

Since May 2024, the chatbot has summarized news from various outlets without linking directly to original articles, including in Canada, where news links are banned on its platforms. This use of news content without compensation and attribution has raised ethical and legal concerns, especially as Meta continues to reduce news visibility on its platforms.

== Research ==
=== Natural language processing ===
One of Meta AI's research areas is natural language processing, including machine translation, natural language generation, and question answering. In 2023, the Meta AI team released a set of natural language processing models named Seamless, designed for enabling real-time voice translation. In 2024, a team including researchers from Meta AI published a paper about developing machine translation for languages not typically supported by machine translation. An editorial article in the journal Nature commented on the paper, emphasizing the importance of involving people who specialize in languages in the development and application of machine learning technology.

==== Galactica ====
Galactica is a large language model (LLM) designed for generating scientific text. It was available for three days from 15 November 2022, before being withdrawn for generating racist and inaccurate content.

==== Llama ====
Llama is an LLM released in February 2023. As of January 2026, the most recent release is the Llama 4.

=== Muse ===
In April 2026, Meta Superintelligence Labs introduced Muse Spark, the first model in the Muse product line. Meta subsequently expanded the product line with specialized models for images and videos. An open-weight version of the model, Muse Spark Open, was released on October 15, 2026, and is a mixture of experts model consisting of 816 billion total parameters and 42 billion active parameters. Meta released a smaller open-weight large language model, Muse Glimmer, on August 10, 2026. It was designed for local agentic and coding workloads. Meta also released Muse Code, a terminal-based coding agent, which can write and debug code, complete longer software development tasks, and run multiple sub-agents concurrently.

=== AI infrastructure ===
Meta has developed large-scale computing infrastructure for artificial intelligence research and deployment. In 2022, it introduced the AI Research SuperCluster (RSC), a GPU-based supercomputer designed to train large models in areas including natural language processing and computer vision.

Meta also develops the Meta Training and Inference Accelerator (MTIA) family of custom AI accelerators for its internal workloads, while continuing to use large clusters of Nvidia GPUs.
