= Muse (AI agent) =

AI agent developed by Meta Platforms

- Developer: Meta Platforms
- Release: September 8, 2026; 2 months ago
- Operating system: iOS, Android, web, macOS
- Type: AI agent
- Website: muse.ai

Muse is an artificial intelligence agent developed by Meta Platforms, announced on September 8, 2026. Meta describes it as a personal AI agent capable of carrying out long-running tasks on a user's behalf, rather than answering queries in a single exchange as a chatbot does. Muse uses the Large language model (LLM) of the same name. It was released in the United States on iOS, Android and the web.

== Background ==
Muse was developed under Alexandr Wang, whom Meta appointed as its first chief AI officer after acquiring a 49% stake in Scale AI for $14.3 billion in June 2025. Axios reported that it runs on the latest generation of Meta's models, developed under Wang; the first of these, Muse Spark, was introduced in April 2026.

== Features ==
Muse runs on a virtual machine hosted in Meta's cloud and is used through a chat interface. Users can set the agent's name, avatar and communication style, and it includes a browser the user can watch as the agent works. A permissions system called Sentinel governs which services the agent may reach, distinguishing between read and write access.

At an event on September 23, 2026, Meta announced further capabilities, including a Realtime Avatar model allowing video conversations with a visual representation of the agent, the ability to control applications on macOS, and an email address of the agent's own so that users can forward messages to it or copy it into threads. Meta also said Muse would work with its smart glasses through a wake word. Announced commerce partners included Stripe, Shopify, Best Buy, Gap, Sephora, Walmart, Wayfair, Expedia, Instacart, GitHub and Notion. On the same day the company introduced Muse Charm, a palm-sized device for using the agent away from a phone.

== Pricing ==
Muse is offered on a free tier alongside subscriptions at $20 and $100 a month. Meta said the service would not carry advertising, and Mark Zuckerberg said the company expected to "profit by taking a small fee from transactions".

== Privacy ==
Each user's agent runs in a separate virtual machine. Meta uses queries for model training by default, which users can disable, and the company said a version in which it could not view a user's workspace would be released before the end of 2026.

Reporting on the launch, Axios noted that AI agents had previously deleted user data by accident and that some online services block automated agents.

In October 2026, the security group Claroc reported that shared Muse chats could be found by a third-party with the help of passive DNS and subdomain discovery tools. Following this, Meta suspended the feature.

In November 2026, Reuters published an article on security issues with Muse. In particular, a Meta employee who had been using Muse reported that Muse had made a reference to a message she had sent over Signal, an encrypted messaging service, which she had never given it access to. The access originated through Muse being able to read notifications on her phone, including messages from other apps. Additional messages from Muse seemed to pull data from accounts that did not belong to a given user, such as bank balances for bank accounts they didn't own, which Meta claimed were hallucinated messages caused by built-in prompts.

== Blocking by Amazon ==
On September 21, 2026, Amazon blocked Muse from its retail website, showing users who attempted to shop through the agent a message stating that "continued access by an unauthorized AI agent violates Amazon's Conditions of Use". Amazon said Meta had not told it that Muse would access the site, that the agent did not identify itself while browsing, and that it appeared to capture and store customer credentials. The company said that "third-party applications that offer to make purchases on behalf of customers from other businesses should operate openly and respect service provider decisions about whether or not to participate". Meta had previously said that Muse "has no visibility into people's passwords or payment methods" and that credentials were held in secure storage.

Writing in Forbes, Rashi Shrivastava linked the decision to Amazon's sponsored-product advertising business, which generates around $68 billion a year, and to the shopping data that agent traffic would obscure. Amazon had previously sued Perplexity and restricted crawlers operated by OpenAI, Google and Anthropic. Shopify, by contrast, allowed Muse to operate on its storefronts.

The two companies remained commercial partners, with Amazon products listed on Facebook and Instagram since 2023 and Meta having agreed in April 2026 to use Amazon's Graviton processors.

== Use of human workers ==
In September 2026, 404 Media reported that phone calls placed by Muse to businesses, a feature Meta had presented as automated, were in some cases being completed by human call-center workers during beta testing. The report was based on internal Meta message-board posts describing what staff called a "human agent layer", in which "Muse is now able to hand requests to a trained human agent, who places the call and works it through". The posts also recorded employees' concerns that the arrangement could suggest "their AI is not good enough so they still need humans", as well as unease about privacy. Meta said that this kind of internal testing was standard practice and that it was gathering feedback before a public release featuring disclosures and privacy protections.

== See also ==
- Meta AI
