= Rainey Funeral Home Building =

- U.S. National Register of Historic Places
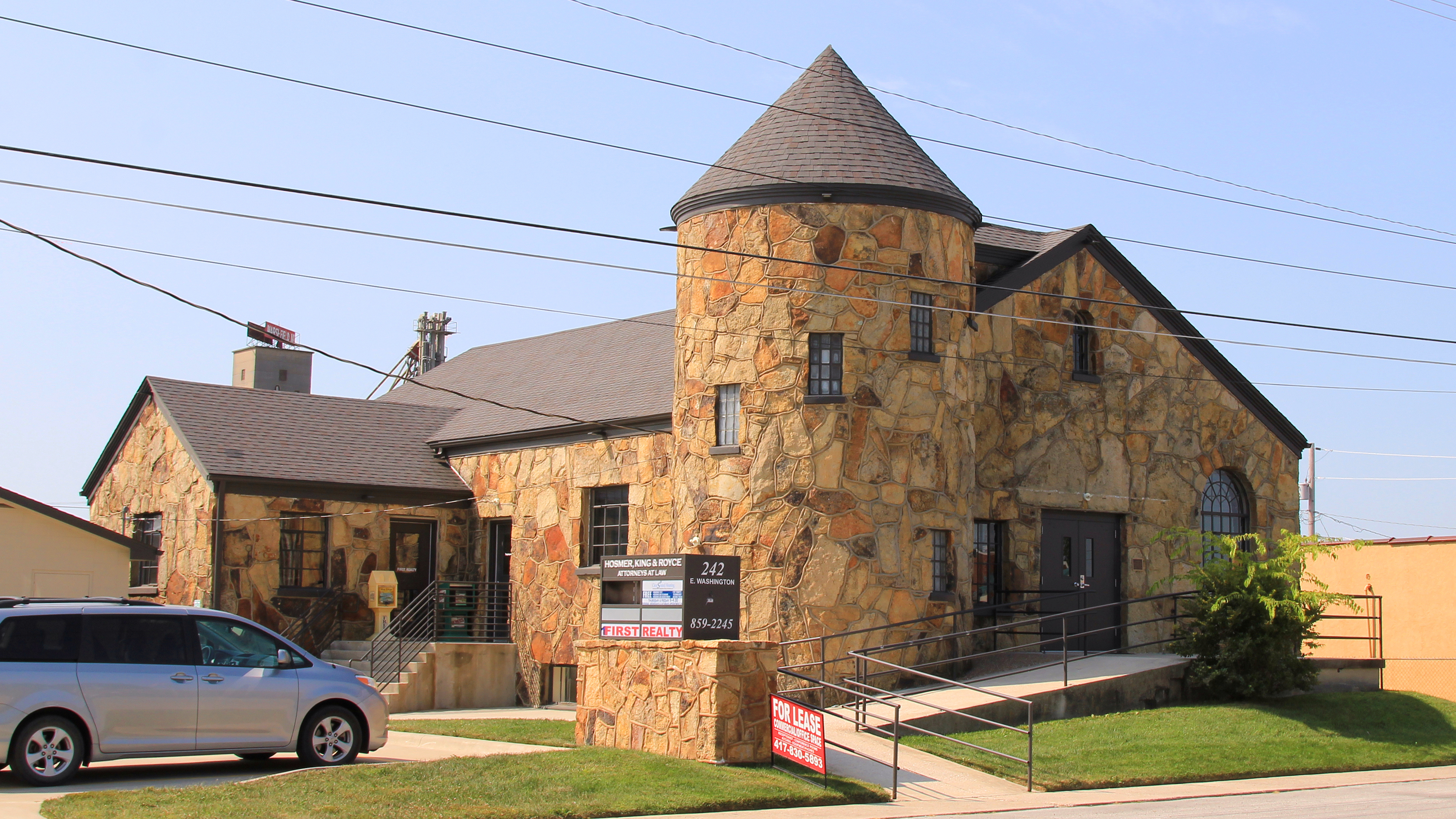

- Location within Missouri Location within the United States
- Location: 242 E. Washington St., Marshfield, Missouri
- Coordinates: 37°20′18″N 92°54′17″W
- Area: Less than 1 acre (0.40 ha)
- Built: c. 1938
- Built by: Dombrowski
- Architectural style: Tudor Revival, Ozark Rock Masonry
- NRHP reference No.: 13001112
- Added to NRHP: January 22, 2014

Rainey Funeral Home Building, also known as Roller-Brllce Funeral Home, Barber-Barto Funeral Home, Barber-Edwards Funeral Home, Barber-Edwards-Arthur Funeral Home, Arthur Funeral Home, and Arthur's Colonial Chapel, is a historic funeral home located at Marshfield, Webster County, Missouri. It was built about 1938, and consists of a 1 1/2-story rectangular main building, two-story tower, and a one-story wing. It is in the Tudor Revival style. It is of wood frame and steel construction with a facade of native Webster County fieldstone with raised mortar joints. The building features a round tower with a conical roof and glass block windows.

It was listed on the National Register of Historic Places in 2014.
