= Muse (language model) =

Artificial intelligence model developed by Meta

- Developer: Meta
- Release: July 9, 2026
- Type: Large language model
- License: Proprietary - Spark and Wonder; Apache 2.0 - Glimmer; Muse Model License - Spark Open
- Website: ai.meta.com

Muse is a large language model (LLM) family developed by Meta through its Meta Superintelligence Labs (MSL) since April 2026. It is the successor to Meta's open weights Llama language model family released from 2023 to 2025.

MSL released four versions of Muse Spark between April and September 2026. In August, it launched Muse Code and low-priced Contributor model tiers in exchange for waiving privacy rights on data. In October it launched Muse Wonder, a competitor to the largest models from Anthropic and OpenAI.

MSL has also released open weights models, beginning with the small language model Muse Glimmer in August, followed by the full-sized Muse Spark Open checkpoint in October.

== Usage ==
It is the first model in Meta's Muse family and is designed for multimodal reasoning, coding, and AI-assisted software development. It is also used for other Meta AI products and services. It can handle a million tokens of context.

== Models ==
=== Muse Spark ===
Muse Spark released on April 8, 2026.

Muse Spark 1.1 released on July 9, 2026.

Muse Spark 1.2 released on August 5, 2026.

Muse Spark 1.3 released on September 2, 2026.

=== Muse Glimmer ===
Muse Glimmer is an open-weight multimodal small language model developed by Meta released on August 10, 2026. The 30-billion-parameter causal language mode combines a large language model with a dedicated perception encoder and supports both natural language and visual inputs. It was designed for local agentic and coding workloads, and can be run offline on a 24 GB consumer GPU. The model weights are distributed under the Apache License 2.0.

=== Muse Wonder ===
Muse Wonder released on October 12, 2026, as a competitor to Anthropic and OpenAI's largest models Claude Fable 5.1 and GPT-6 Astra. A more capable version, Wonder Full, is available via the top subscription tier but not via API.

=== Muse Spark Open ===
An open-weight version of the model, Muse Spark Open, was released on October 15, 2026, and is a mixture of experts model consisting of 816 billion total parameters and 42 billion active parameters.

== Muse Code ==
Meta released Muse Code, a terminal-based coding agent harness, alongside Muse Spark 1.2 on August 5, 2026. Powered by the model, it can write and debug code, complete longer software development tasks, and run multiple sub-agents concurrently. Muse Spark 1.2 was also made available through the Meta Model API and OpenRouter. A lower-priced contributor tier allows Meta to retain submitted data to improve its products, while data submitted through the higher-priced standard tier is not retained for that purpose.

== See also ==
- Application programming interface
- List of AI-assisted software development tools
- List of large language models
- Llama (language model)
- Muse (AI agent)
