= Alexandr Wang =

American entrepreneur (born 1997)

- 汪滔
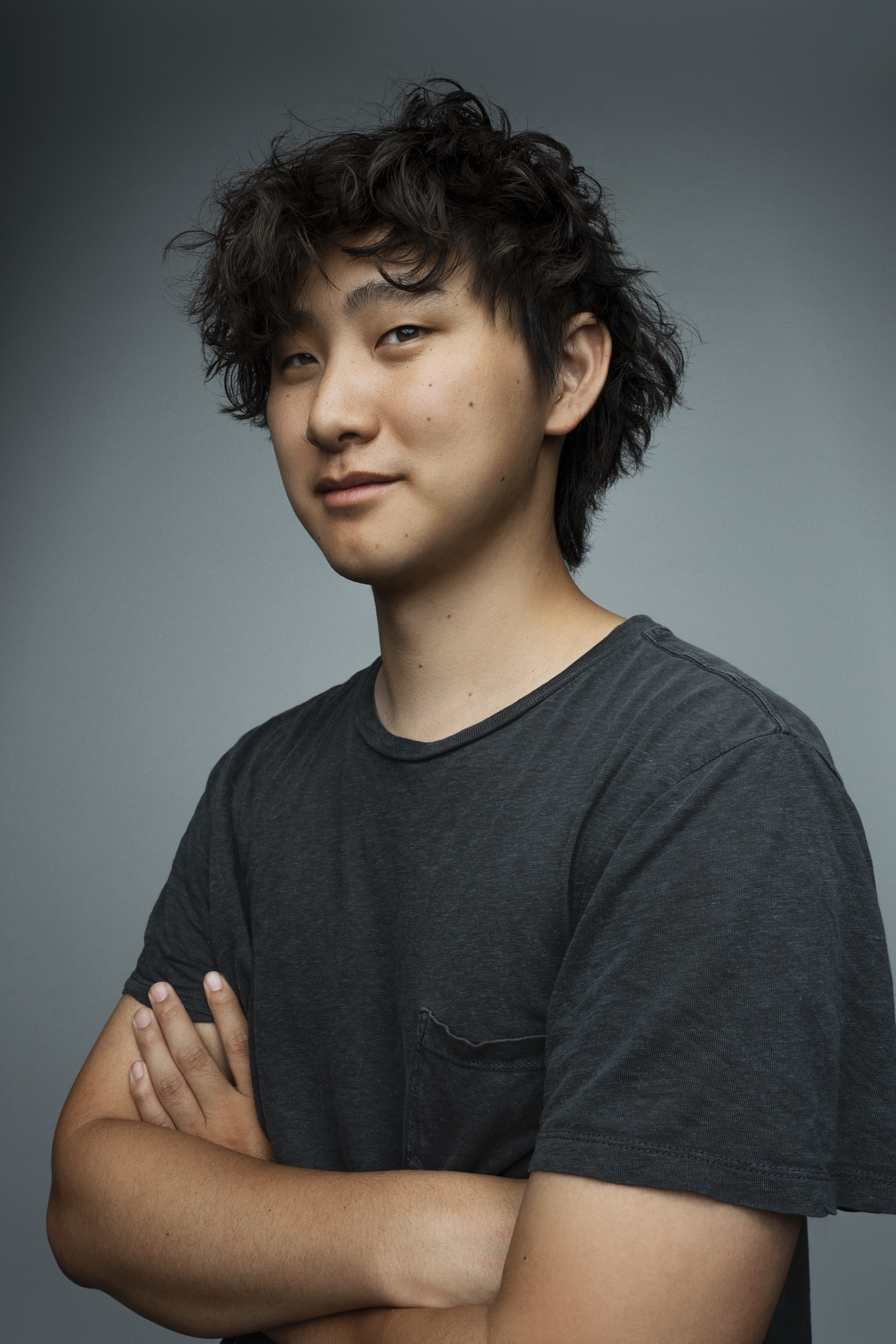
- Wang in 2025
- Born: January 1997 (age 29); Los Alamos, New Mexico, U.S.
- Education: Massachusetts Institute of Technology (dropped out)
- Title: Chief AI Officer at Meta; Founder of Scale AI

Chinese name
- Chinese: 汪滔
Transcriptions
Standard Mandarin
- Hanyu Pinyin: Wāng Tāo
- Bopomofo: ㄨㄤ ㄊㄠ
- Wade–Giles: Wang¹ T'ao¹

Alexandr Wang (Chinese: 汪滔; pinyin: Wāng Tāo; born January 1997) is an American entrepreneur. He has been the chief AI officer of Meta Platforms since 2025 and leads its Superintelligence Labs. He is a co-founder and former CEO of Scale AI, an artificial intelligence company that provides data labeling and large language model evaluation services to develop AI applications. In 2021, Wang became the world's youngest "self-made billionaire" at age 24. Forbes estimated his net worth at $3.6 billion as of April 2025.

== Early life and education ==
Alexandr Wang was born in Los Alamos, New Mexico, in January 1997 to Chinese immigrants who worked as physicists at the Los Alamos National Laboratory in New Mexico. He qualified for the Math Olympiad Program in 2013, the US Physics Team in 2014, and was a USACO finalist in 2012 and 2013. He studied at Los Alamos High School, before moving to Silicon Valley to become a software engineer at Addepar, a wealth management company.

During his teens, Wang worked for Quora as a software programmer. He briefly attended the Massachusetts Institute of Technology (MIT) and had an internship at the high-frequency trading firm Hudson River Trading, but dropped out of MIT to co-found Scale AI in 2016.

== Career ==
In 2016, Wang and Lucy Guo co-founded Scale AI, an artificial intelligence company that provides data labeling and model evaluation services to develop AI applications. Former Amazon executive Jeff Wilke served as an advisor to Wang. In 2021, the company's valuation hit $7.3 billion, briefly giving Wang a $1 billion net worth, as he owned 15% of the company. Scale AI has received defense contracts from the United States Armed Forces, and has been tapped by the Pentagon's Chief Digital and Artificial Intelligence Office to test and evaluate the safety and reliability of large language models for military planning and decision-making.

Wang joined the board of Expedia Group in 2023. In July 2023, Wang testified before a House Armed Services subcommittee hearing, speaking on the challenges and potential solutions that the U.S. government faced in adopting AI.

Wang introduced a hiring approach he called “merit, excellence, and intelligence” (MEI) in June 2024, explicitly framing it in opposition to corporate diversity, equity, and inclusion (DEI) programs. The announcement drew praise from figures including Elon Musk and Coinbase CEO Brian Armstrong, while DEI researchers said it mischaracterized how diversity initiatives actually functioned.

In January 2025, Wang was among a group of tech-based founders and chief executive officers at the second inauguration of Donald Trump. He also wrote a letter directly to President Trump, stating that “America must win the AI war.” Later in the month, Wang spoke at the World Economic Forum, highlighting the AI race between the United States and China, specifically surrounding the capabilities of DeepSeek. In February 2025, Wang met with multiple world leaders, including UK prime minister Keir Starmer, Indian prime minister Narendra Modi, French president Emmanuel Macron, and United States House of Representatives speaker Mike Johnson, who also oversees the House Bipartisan Task Force on Artificial Intelligence, speaking to them about global cooperation surrounding AI. In June 2025, Meta Platforms purchased 49% of Scale AI and Wang moved to work for Meta. He stepped down as CEO of Scale but remained on the board of Scale AI. Meta announced that it will invest $14.3 billion in Scale AI, which will be overseen by Meta Superintelligence Labs.

== Personal life ==
During the height of the COVID-19 pandemic, Wang was roommates with his friend Sam Altman, the chief executive officer of OpenAI.

== Recognition ==
In 2018, Wang was named to Forbes's 30 Under 30 list in the Enterprise Technology category. He was named to the same list in 2021. He was also named to the Time 100 Next, which recognizes emerging leaders who are shaping the future of their fields, and to the Time 100 AI list.
