= Scale AI =

American data annotation company

Scale AI, Inc.
- Type: Private
- Industry: Information technology
- Founded: 2016; 10 years ago
- Founders: Alexandr Wang; Lucy Guo
- Headquarters: San Francisco, California, United States
- Key people: Francis deSouza (CEO)
- Revenue: $870 million (2024)
- Owners: Meta Platforms (49%)
- Number of employees: 1,200 (2025)
- Subsidiaries: Remotasks; Outlier
- Website: scale.com

Scale AI, Inc. is an American artificial intelligence infrastructure and software company based in San Francisco, California. Originally focused on data annotation, the company also offers RLHF services, large language model (LLM) evaluation, and enterprise software suites to build and deploy AI applications.

The company’s research arm, the Safety, Evaluation and Alignment Lab, focuses on evaluating and aligning LLMs. It also co-created the benchmark Humanity's Last Exam. Scale AI outsources data labeling through its subsidiaries, Remotasks, which focuses on computer vision and autonomous vehicles, and Outlier, which focuses on annotating data for LLMs.

Scale AI operates an LLM Red Team that conducts human adversarial testing to identify vulnerabilities, biases, and safety risks in AI models. The team has worked with OpenAI, Google DeepMind and national AI Safety Institutes to evaluate systems against complex threats, including cybersecurity vulnerabilities, jailbreaks, and agentic AI behaviors.

Scale AI's customers in the commercial sector have included Google, Microsoft, Meta, General Motors, OpenAI, and Time. The company also directly works with world governments, including the United States on military-related projects, and with Qatar to improve the efficiency of its social programs.

In June 2025, Meta Platforms spent more than $14 billion to acquire a 49% non-voting stake in Scale AI. CEO Alexandr Wang left Scale AI to join Meta and was replaced by Jason Droege.

== History ==
=== Early years (2016–2019) ===
Scale was founded in 2016 by Alexandr Wang and Lucy Guo through Y Combinator. The pair had worked together at Quora. Initial investors of Scale included Dragoneer Investment Group, Tiger Global Management and Index Ventures. Guo was fired in 2018.

In August 2019, after Peter Thiel’s Founders Fund made a $100 million investment in Scale, the company's valuation exceeded $1 billion, and it acquired unicorn status.

=== Growth (2019–2025) ===
Scale contracted with the United States Department of Defense in 2020.

In May 2021, Michael Kratsios, Chief Technology Officer of the United States under the Trump administration, joined as Scale AI's managing director and head of strategy.

By July 2021, Scale had reached a valuation of $7 billion, after a financing led by Greenoaks, Dragoneer Investment Group and Tiger Global Management. There was an increased demand for data labelling from clients in different industries.

In January 2022, Scale AI won a $250 million contract to give American federal agencies access to its suite of tools. In February 2022, Scale AI developed its Automated Damage Identification Service in response to the Russian invasion of Ukraine. Satellite imagery was analyzed to measure the damage to buildings, which were then geotagged and reported to humanitarian groups. In November 2022, Scale AI was recognized by Time on it’s Best Inventions of 2022 list. The company also opened an office in St. Louis in that same year.

In January 2023, Scale laid off 20% of its workforce.

In May 2023, Scale AI signed a deal with the US Army’s XVIII Airborne Corps, becoming the first AI company to deploy its LLM (known as Donovan) on a classified network.

In August 2023, Scale AI became OpenAI’s "preferred partner" to fine-tune GPT-3.5. The company's services were used to create ChatGPT. In that same month, Scale AI’s evaluation platform was used at DEF CON, a hacking convention, at its first generative AI red team event, testing models provided by various companies.

In December 2023, Scale AI was among a list of companies that contributed to Meta’s Purple Llama initiative, a security framework for the purpose of development of open generative AI models.

In February 2024, Scale AI was selected by the Department of Defense to test and evaluate its LLMs for military purposes under a one-year contract.

In March 2024, Scale reached a valuation of almost $13 billion after Accel led another round of funding. In May 2024, Scale raised an additional $1 billion with new investors including Amazon and Meta Platforms. Its valuation reached $14 billion.

In August 2024, Scale signed an agreement with the US AI Safety Institute, to collaborate on research, testing, and evaluation of the company’s AI models. The US AI Safety Institute is controlled by the Department of Commerce’s National Institute of Standards and Technology.

In December 2024, Scale was sued by a former employee, alleging that the company was committing wage theft and misclassifying workers. The following month, a second employee filed a similar suit. In January 2025, several contractors sued Scale alleging psychological harm from being exposed to disturbing content.

In January 2025, it was reported in The Conversation that Scale AI and Meta had previously teamed up to create and sell Defense Llama, an LLM product with military-style defense purposes. The company also took out a full-page ad in The Washington Post, appealing to American President Donald Trump to "win the AI war". Later in the month, Scale AI and the Center for AI Safety partnered to release Humanity's Last Exam, a benchmark test for AI systems. The company has assisted in the development of the benchmarks EnigmaEval, MultiChallenge, and MASK.

In February 2025, Scale AI agreed to a five-year partnership with the Qatari government to improve government services via AI-based tools and training, including predictive analytics, automation, and advanced data analytics. The deal was signed at the Web Qatar 2025 Summit by Mohammed bin Ali bin Mohammed Al Mannai, the Qatari Minister of Communications and Information Technology. Also in February, the company became a third-party evaluator of AI models for the U.S. AI Safety Institute.

In March 2025, Scale AI reached a multimillion-dollar deal with the United States Department of Defense to develop the Thunderforge project, a "major step in U.S. military automation". The project aims to use AI to “plan and help execute movements of ships, planes, and other assets”, with the goal of speeding up military decisions in both peace and wartime. The contract was awarded to Scale AI and other companies (such as Anduril Industries and Microsoft) by the Defense Innovation Unit, and is intended to first be used with the USINDOPACOM and EUCOM.

In April 2025, Scale AI released Scale Evaluation, a platform for testing LLMs against benchmarks to pinpoint weaknesses and flag where additional training data would improve the model.

=== Additional investment from Meta (2025) ===
On June 10, 2025, it was reported that Meta Platforms had agreed to purchase a 49% stake (non-voting) in Scale AI for $14.8 billion. The company will remain as a standalone, independent entity from Meta. Former CEO Alexandr Wang took a top position inside Meta as a part of the deal and was replaced by the company's chief strategy officer and former Uber executive, Jason Droege.

=== Scale Labs ===
In March 2026, the company launched Scale Labs, an expanded research division that builds upon its Safety, Evaluation, and Alignment Lab (SEAL), founded in 2023. Scale Labs serves as a hub for research on AI model capabilities, post-training evaluation methods, enterprise deployment, and risk-oversight infrastructure. The division focuses on understanding and testing the reliability of advanced, agentic, and multimodal AI systems in real-world environments, developing public benchmarks and evaluation frameworks such as SWE-Atlas and Voice Showdown.

== Remotasks ==
In 2017, Scale AI established Remotasks, a crowdworking platform to support the creation of labeled data for machine learning, particularly in areas such as computer vision and autonomous vehicles. The subsidiary has facilities in Southeast Asia and Africa.

In 2019, Scale AI set up a company called Smart Ecosystem Philippines to operate Remotasks within the country. In the Philippines, many of Remotasks' hires are freelance contractors not covered under labor laws. The pay for some annotation tasks dropped to less than one cent due to "vicious competition" after Remotask expanded to India as well as Venezuela. Late payments are reportedly "commonplace", and some workers received only a few percent of their promised compensation. In 2022, an Oxford Internet Institute study said Remotasks met the "minimum standards of fair work" in only one out of ten criteria.

Remotasks has been criticized for obscuring its affiliation with Scale AI, opaque communications, and abrupt changes in worker access in some regions. In early 2024, the platform terminated operations in several countries, including Kenya, Nigeria, and Pakistan, citing administrative and operational considerations.

== Outlier ==
Outlier is a separate contributor platform operated by Scale AI, designed for generative AI data work, particularly in the development and fine-tuning of LLMs. Contributors on Outlier typically include professionals with advanced degrees, industry expertise, and native fluency in various languages. Outlier tasks involve content evaluation and reinforcement learning from human feedback (RLHF).
