= GPT-5 =

2025 multimodal model by OpenAI

- Developer: OpenAI
- Release: August 7, 2025; 14 months ago
- Written in: C; C++; Python; TypeScript
- Included with: ChatGPT; Microsoft Copilot
- Predecessor: GPT-4.1; OpenAI o3; OpenAI o4-mini
- Successor: GPT-5.1
- Type: Multimodal; Large language model; Generative pre-trained transformer; Foundation model
- License: Proprietary
- Website: openai.com/gpt-5

GPT-5 is a multimodal large language model developed by OpenAI and the fifth in its series of generative pre-trained transformer (GPT) foundation models. Preceded in the series by GPT-4, it was launched on August 7, 2025. It is publicly accessible to users of the chatbot products ChatGPT and Microsoft Copilot as well as to developers through the OpenAI API.

== Background ==
On April 14, 2023, Sam Altman, the chief executive officer of OpenAI, spoke at an event at the Massachusetts Institute of Technology and said that the company was not training GPT-5 at that time. He stated that OpenAI was "prioritizing GPT-4 development" and that "we are not and won't for some time" release GPT-5.

On July 18, OpenAI filed for a "GPT-5" trademark in the United States. On November 13, Altman confirmed to the Financial Times that the company was working to develop GPT-5.

According to The Information, "[f]or much of the second half of 2024, OpenAI was developing a model known internally as Orion and intended to become GPT-5", "[b]ut the Orion effort failed to produce a better model, and the company instead released it as GPT-4.5 in February [2025]."

By late July 2025, OpenAI was widely anticipated as planning to release GPT-5 in early August. On July 30, The Verge reported that "Microsoft is getting ready for GPT-5" as "sources familiar with Microsoft's AI plans" told an editor that the company was testing a new mode for its Copilot chatbot that would offer a model that "thinks deeply or quickly based on the task". On August 5, in the leadup to the release of GPT-5, OpenAI released GPT-OSS, a set of two open-weight models that have reasoning capabilities. GPT-5 was then unveiled during a livestream event on August 7.

== Capabilities ==
At the time of its release, GPT-5 had state-of-the-art performance on benchmarks that test mathematics, programming, finance, and multimodal understanding. According to OpenAI, improvements over its predecessor models include faster response times, better coding and writing skills, more accurate answers to health questions, and lower levels of hallucination. Also, compared to previous models, GPT-5 aims to give safe, high-level responses to potentially harmful queries rather than outright declining them, an approach that OpenAI refers to as "safe completions", aiming to result "in GPT-5 being able to refuse more unsafe questions, while offering fewer rejections to users seeking harmless information." In addition, GPT-5 was trained to give more critical, "less effusively agreeable" answers compared to its predecessor models.

Days before the launch of GPT-5, two early testers of the model stated that they were "impressed" by its ability to code and to solve mathematical and scientific problems. They suggested that the model shows great improvement from GPT-4, but not as large of a gain as from GPT-3 to GPT-4. A day prior to the release of GPT-5, during a press briefing, Sam Altman, the chief executive officer of OpenAI, called GPT-5 "a significant step along the path to AGI", referring to artificial general intelligence, the hypothetical level of intelligence that OpenAI defines as the ability to perform any economically valuable task that a human can. According to Altman, GPT-5 is "significantly better" than its predecessors, offering "PhD-level" abilities across a wide range of tasks.

The exact energy consumption of GPT-5 use has not been disclosed by OpenAI. Researchers at the University of Rhode Island estimated that a medium-length response consumes slightly over 18 watt-hours, tequivalent to using an incandescent bulb for 18 minutes [sic].

=== Architecture ===
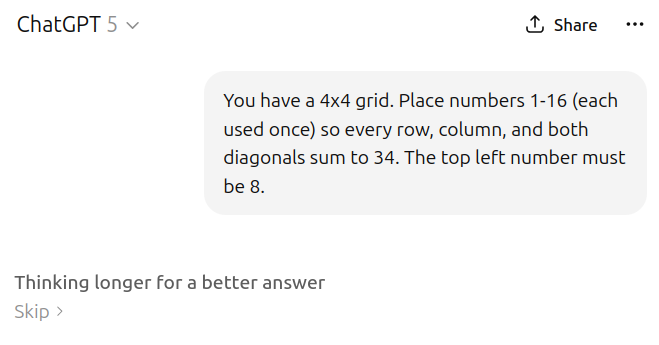
When the GPT-5 router determines that responding to a request may involve complex reasoning, GPT-5 defaults to its "thinking" model, but a user can choose to override this behavior by requesting a quicker answer instead.

GPT-5 is a system that contains a fast, high-throughput model, a deeper reasoning model, and a real-time router that decides which model to use based on conversation type, complexity, tool needs, and explicit user intent. Altman had previously criticized the manual model picker for being overly complex, suggesting a need for unification. GPT-5 also includes agentic functionality through which it can set up its own desktop and can use its browser to search autonomously for sources that relate to its task. The GPT-5 system card defines two fast, high-throughput models – gpt-5-main and gpt-5-main-mini – and two thinking models – gpt-5-thinking and gpt-5-thinking-mini. In the OpenAI API, developers can access the thinking model, its mini version, and gpt-5-thinking-nano, an even smaller and faster nano version of the thinking model. The version of GPT-5 that is accessible via the API has adjustable reasoning effort (low, medium, high, or minimal) and verbosity (low, medium, or high). Additionally, ChatGPT provides access to gpt-5-thinking with a setting that makes use of parallel test-time compute, referred to as gpt-5-thinking-pro.

== Limitations ==
=== Safety ===
Neuraltrust, a security research company, claimed to have successfully compromised GPT-5 within its first day of testing the model. According to its report, it enabled GPT-5 to generate detailed instructions for manufacturing explosive devices. SPLX, another company, conducted similar tests and came to similar conclusions about GPT-5's security. Their assessments suggest that GPT-5 has significant security gaps, potentially rendering it as being unsafe for use in a corporate environment.

== Training ==
According to AIMultiple, GPT-5 is natively multimodal, meaning that it was trained from scratch on multiple modalities (like text and images) at once without relying on already-trained language or vision models. Its training process involved three stages: unsupervised pretraining, supervised fine-tuning, and reinforcement learning from human feedback. Pretraining used a large-scale multilingual dataset of books, articles, web pages, academic papers, and licensed sources. GPT-5's visual and text capabilities were described as having been developed alongside each other throughout training, unlike with GPT-4.

== Use ==
GPT-5 is used in ChatGPT. Although GPT-5 is free for all ChatGPT users, Plus users get higher use limits while Pro users get unlimited access to GPT-5 as well as limited access to GPT-5 Pro. Standard limits for lower-tier users on responses per hour still apply. Additionally, with the introduction of GPT-5, ChatGPT's "Advanced Voice Mode" was replaced by "ChatGPT Voice", which is supposed to enable more natural-sounding conversations. OpenAI stated that "Standard Voice Mode retires on September 9, 2025, unifying all users on ChatGPT Voice". On November 24, 2025, the feature of shopping research was added to ChatGPT, claimed to be a mini model post-trained on gpt-5-thinking-mini.

GPT-5 is also available in Microsoft Copilot, and Microsoft stated that it will incorporate GPT-5 into a wide variety of its products. According to 9to5Mac, Apple Inc. is planning to integrate the model into the Apple Intelligence feature in its iOS 26, iPadOS 26, and macOS Tahoe operating systems. It is also accessible via the OpenAI API.

A number of American companies were reported as having received access to GPT-5 ahead of its launch. OpenAI stated that the private health insurance company Oscar Health was checking applications from its policyholders with the model. In addition, Uber was using GPT-5 for its customer support system; GitLab, Windsurf, and Cursor were using the model for software development; and the Spanish bank BBVA was using it for financial analysis. Other companies that OpenAI listed as having used GPT-5 pre-release include Amgen, Lowe's, and Notion.

== Reception ==
=== Critical reviews ===
Grace Huckins in MIT Technology Review found that, "[w]hereas o1 was a major technological advancement, GPT-5 is, above all else, a refined product." In response to claims that Sam Altman, the chief executive officer of OpenAI, had made about the model, she stated that "GPT-5 will furnish a more pleasant and seamless user experience. That's not nothing, but it falls far short of the transformative AI future that Altman has spent much of the past year hyping." In response to Altman's claim that GPT-5 is "a significant step along the path" to artificial general intelligence, she noted: "[M]aybe he's right—but if so, it's a very small step."

In The Information, Stephanie Palazzolo praised GPT-5's coding capabilities.

According to Matteo Wong in The Atlantic, GPT-5 "is intuitive, fast, and efficient; adapts to human preferences and intentions; and is easy to personalize." He stated: "At this stage of the AI boom, when every major chatbot is legitimately helpful in numerous ways, benchmarks, science, and rigor feel almost insignificant. What matters is how the chatbot feels [...]".

John Herrman from the New York magazine wrote: "Casual users who encounter GPT-5 through ChatGPT aren't likely to feel like they're using a completely different product [...] while people who use it for software development or in a corporate context are more likely to notice a major change."

Mashable's Christian de Looper found that "GPT-5's coolest feature by far is its ability to make custom, interactive applications based on simple, natural-language prompts. It's a vibe coder's dream come true."

Kyle Orland of Ars Technica tested GPT-5, comparing it with GPT-4o, and determined that "GPT-4o tends to provide a little more detail and be a little more personable than the more direct, concise responses of GPT-5."

=== User responses ===
GPT-5's new router system that automatically switches models depending on task was criticized for leading to responses of inconsistent quality; many users reported that GPT-5 was sometimes performing worse than GPT-4o. A day after GPT-5 was released, Altman responded to this, saying that "GPT-5 will seem smarter starting today" and that "[y]esterday, the autoswitcher broke and was out of commission for a chunk of the day, and the result was GPT-5 seemed way dumber."

Some users also criticized that with the release of GPT-5, legacy GPT models were no longer available within ChatGPT for non-Pro users. Some users were particularly frustrated over this removal without prior warning because they used different GPT models for distinct purposes and found that the GPT-5 router system left them with less control. As a response, in a post on X, Altman said that OpenAI would bring back an option to select GPT-4o for Plus users as well and that OpenAI "will watch usage as we think about how long to offer legacy models for."

In addition, some users preferred GPT-4o's warmer and more personal tone over that of GPT-5, which they described as "flat", "uncreative" and "lobotomized", and as resembling an "overworked secretary". Altman responded to this on X, stating: "We for sure underestimated how much some of the things that people like in GPT-4o matter to them, even if GPT-5 performs better in most ways." "Long-term, this has reinforced that we really need good ways for different users to customize things (we understand that there isn't one model that works for everyone, and we have been investing in steerability research and launched a research preview of different personalities)." On August 13, 2025, Altman stated on X that OpenAI was working on GPT-5's personality to make the model "feel warmer". A corresponding update was rolled out on August 15.

Furthermore, Altman was criticized for overhyping GPT-5's capabilities and setting expectations too high after he compared GPT-5's creation to the Manhattan Project, said that the model made him "feel useless", and posted an uncommented image of the Death Star on X a day before GPT-5 was unveiled.

== See also ==
- List of large language models
