= OpenAI o4-mini =

OpenAI reasoning language model

o4-mini
- Developer: OpenAI
- Release: April 16, 2025
- Predecessor: OpenAI o3-mini
- Successor: GPT-5 mini
- Type: Generative pre-trained transformer; Reasoning large language model

OpenAI o4-mini was a generative pre-trained transformer model created by OpenAI. On April 24, 2025, the o4-mini model was released to all ChatGPT users (including free-tier users) as well as via the Chat Completions API and Responses API. Its retirement from ChatGPT was announced on January 29, 2026, and it was retired on February 13, 2026.

Additionally, OpenAI introduced the o4-mini-high model, which was made available exclusively to paid-tier ChatGPT users. The high model was a slower model which had a higher reasoning effort to produce more accurate responses.

Unlike earlier models, o4-mini was capable of processing both text and images. It also allowed to perform tasks like analyzing whiteboard sketches during its "chain-of-thought" phase.

== History ==
=== Development and release ===
Sam Altman initially planned to include o4-mini in GPT-5 instead of releasing them as stand-alone models. However, on April 16, 2025, o4-mini was released alongside OpenAI o3 to paid subscribers and via the OpenAI API. Both were released as vision-language models. On April 24, 2025, o4-mini was released to all ChatGPT users, including free-tier users, as well as via the Chat Completions API and Responses API. OpenAI o3 was made only available to paid subscribers.

=== Retirement ===
On January 29, 2026, the retirement of o4-mini was announced. It was retired from ChatGPT on February 13, 2026, alongside GPT-4o, GPT-5, GPT-4.1 mini, and GPT-4.1.

== See also ==
- List of large language models
