= GPT-4.1 =

2025 large language model

- Developer: OpenAI
- Release: April 14, 2025; 15 months ago
- Predecessor: GPT-4o; GPT-4.5
- Successor: GPT-5
- Type: Multimodal; Large language model; Generative pre-trained transformer; Foundation model
- License: Proprietary
- Website: openai.com/index/gpt-4-1/

GPT-4.1 is a large language model within OpenAI's GPT series. It was released on April 14, 2025. GPT-4.1 can be accessed through the OpenAI API or the OpenAI Developer Playground. Three different models were simultaneously released: GPT-4.1, GPT-4.1 mini, and GPT-4.1 nano. Since May 14, GPT-4.1 has been available for users subscribed to the ChatGPT Plus and Pro plans, and GPT-4.1 mini that replaces GPT-4o mini is available for all ChatGPT users.

== Reception ==
Zvi Mowshowitz praised the model itself while criticizing OpenAI for not doing enough safety testing.

Two research teams, one led by researcher Owain Evans, the other with the startup company SplxAI, independently found evidence that GPT-4.1 could be more misaligned than GPT-4o.

== See also ==
- List of large language models
