= GPT-4.5 =

2025 large language model

- Developer: OpenAI
- Release: February 27, 2025; 16 months ago
- Predecessor: GPT-4o
- Successor: GPT-4.1
- Available in: 15 languages

GPT-4.5 (codenamed "Orion") is a large language model developed by OpenAI as part of the GPT series. Officially released on February 27, 2025, GPT-4.5 is available to users subscribed to the ChatGPT Plus and Pro plans across web, mobile, and desktop platforms. Access was also provided through the OpenAI API and Developer Playground until July 14, 2025. On August 7, 2025, with the release of GPT-5, GPT-4.5 was removed from both the API and ChatGPT users with the Plus and Teams tier, while Pro users are still able to access to GPT-4.5 model under the "Legacy Models" tab. On May 28th, 2026, It was announced that GPT-4.5 would be sunset completely from ChatGPT on June 27th, 2026.

== Overview ==
GPT-4.5 was primarily trained using unsupervised learning, which improves its ability to recognize patterns, draw connections, and generate creative insights without reasoning. This method was combined with supervised fine-tuning and reinforcement learning from human feedback. The computational resources needed for training were provided by Microsoft Azure.

Sam Altman described GPT-4.5 as a "giant, expensive model". As of February 2025, through OpenAI's API it costs $75 per million input tokens and $150 per million output tokens, whereas GPT-4o only costs $2.50 per million input tokens and $10 per million output tokens.

The model was tested on the MMLU test set, which tested 15 different languages, namely Arabic, Bengali, Chinese, English, French, German, Hindi, Indonesian, Italian, Japanese, Korean, Portuguese, Spanish, Swahili, and Yoruba, with the model outperforming GPT-4o on all of them.

In April 2025, OpenAI announced that it was phasing out GPT-4.5 from API access in favor of GPT-4.1, set to take effect on July 14.

== Reception ==
GPT-4.5 was mostly seen by reviewers as an incremental upgrade over GPT-4o. Cade Metz, writing for The New York Times, stated that the model "signifies the end of an era" as it is their last chatbot to not do chain of thought reasoning. The Times also said it was "unlikely to generate as much excitement as GPT-4". Eric Schwartz from TechRadar praised its ability to understand subtext and respond to questions in a more humanlike manner compared to GPT-4o, but concluded that "it doesn't feel like an enormous leap" from the prior model. Aaron Levie, the CEO of cloud services company Box, told Axios that GPT-4.5 is "about 20% better" than GPT-4o on specific tasks, such as information extraction in large datasets.

== See also ==
- List of large language models
