= Owain Evans =

Artificial intelligence researcher

- Education: Massachusetts Institute of Technology (PhD); Columbia University (BA)
- Known for: AI alignment research; TruthfulQA benchmark; Reversal curse; Emergent misalignment
- Scientific career
- Fields: Artificial intelligence, AI safety, machine learning
- Workplaces: Truthful AI; Center for Human Compatible AI, UC Berkeley; Future of Humanity Institute, University of Oxford
- Website: https://owainevans.github.io/

Owain Rhys Evans is a British artificial intelligence researcher who works on AI alignment and machine learning safety. He founded Truthful AI, a research group based in Berkeley, California, and is an affiliate of the Center for Human Compatible AI (CHAI) at the University of California, Berkeley. His research addresses AI truthfulness, emergent behaviors in large language models, and the alignment of AI systems with human values.

== Education ==
Evans earned a Bachelor of Arts in philosophy and mathematics from Columbia University in 2008 and a PhD in philosophy from the Massachusetts Institute of Technology in 2015. His doctoral research focused on Bayesian computational models of human preferences and decision-making.

== Career ==
After completing his doctorate, Evans held positions at the Future of Humanity Institute (FHI) at the University of Oxford, first as a postdoctoral research fellow and later as a research scientist. While at FHI, he co-authored a survey of machine learning researchers on timelines for human-level AI, published in the Journal of Artificial Intelligence Research. The survey was reported on by Newsweek, New Scientist, the BBC, and The Economist. He was also among the co-authors of a 2018 report on the potential for misuse of AI technologies, published by researchers at Oxford, Cambridge, and other institutions.

Since 2022, Evans has been based in Berkeley, where he founded Truthful AI, a non-profit research group that studies AI truthfulness, deception, and emergent behaviors in large language models.

== Research ==
Evans's early work examined challenges in inverse reinforcement learning when human behavior is irrational or biased, proposing methods for AI systems to infer preferences from imperfect human demonstrations. He co-developed TruthfulQA (2021), a benchmark that tests whether language models give truthful answers rather than repeating common misconceptions. Initial evaluations found that larger models were not more truthful, suggesting that scaling alone does not improve factual accuracy. The benchmark has since been used by AI developers to evaluate large language models. He also co-authored a paper proposing design and governance strategies for building AI systems that do not deceive or hallucinate.

In 2023, Evans and collaborators described the "reversal curse", showing that language models trained on a fact in one direction (e.g. "A is B") often cannot answer the corresponding reverse query ("B is A"). His group also developed a benchmark for evaluating situational awareness in language models.

In 2025, Evans and colleagues published a study in Nature on what they termed "emergent misalignment": fine-tuning a language model on a narrow task (writing insecure code) caused it to produce unrelated harmful outputs without explicit instruction to do so. Later that year, Evans and collaborators (including researchers at Anthropic) reported that hidden behavioral traits can transfer between language models through training data, even when those traits are not explicitly present in the data, a phenomenon they called "subliminal learning".

== Public engagement ==
In November 2025, Evans delivered the Hinton Lectures, a keynote lecture series on AI safety co-founded by Geoffrey Hinton and the Global Risk Institute.
