= Kneser–Ney smoothing =

Statistical method

Kneser–Ney smoothing, also known as Kneser–Essen–Ney smoothing, is a method primarily used to calculate the probability distribution of n-grams in a document based on their histories. It is widely considered the most effective method of smoothing due to its use of absolute discounting by subtracting a fixed value from the probability's lower order terms to omit n-grams with lower frequencies. This approach has been considered equally effective for both higher and lower order n-grams. The method was proposed in a 1994 paper by Reinhard Kneser, Ute Essen and Hermann Ney.

A common example that illustrates the concept behind this method is the frequency of the bigram "San Francisco". If it appears several times in a training corpus, the frequency of the unigram "Francisco" will also be high. Relying on only the unigram frequency to predict the frequencies of n-grams leads to skewed results; however, Kneser–Ney smoothing corrects this by considering the frequency of the unigram in relation to possible words preceding it.

== Method ==
Let $c(w,w')$ be the number of occurrences of the word $w$ followed by the word $w'$ in the corpus.

The equation for bigram probabilities is as follows:

$p_{KN}(w_i|w_{i-1}) = \frac{\max(c(w_{i-1},w_{i}) - \delta,0)}{\sum_{w'} c(w_{i-1},w')} + \lambda_{w_{i-1}} p_{KN}(w_i)$

Where the unigram probability $p_{KN}(w_i)$ depends on how likely it is to see the word $w_i$ in an unfamiliar context, which is estimated as the number of times it appears after any other word divided by the number of distinct pairs of consecutive words in the corpus:

$p_{KN}(w_i) = \frac { |\{ w' : 0 < c(w',w_i) \} | } { |\{ (w',w'') : 0 < c(w',w'') \} | }$

Note that $p_{KN}$ is a proper distribution, as the values defined in the above way are non-negative and sum to one.

The parameter $\delta$ is a constant which denotes the discount value subtracted from the count of each n-gram, usually between 0 and 1.

The value of the normalizing constant $\lambda_{w_{i-1}}$ is calculated to make the sum of conditional probabilities $p_{KN}(w_i|w_{i-1})$ over all $w_i$ equal to one. Observe that (provided $\delta < 1$) for each $w_i$ which occurs at least once in the context of $w_{i-1}$ in the corpus we discount the probability by exactly the same constant amount ${\delta} / \left(\sum_{w'} c(w_{i-1},w')\right)$, so the total discount depends linearly on the number of unique words $w_i$ that can occur after $w_{i-1}$. This total discount is a budget we can spread over all $p_{KN}(w_i|w_{i-1})$ proportionally to $p_{KN}(w_i)$. As the values of $p_{KN}(w_i)$ sum to one, we can simply define $\lambda_{w_{i-1}}$ to be equal to this total discount:

$\lambda_{w_{i-1}} = \frac {\delta} {\sum_{w'} c(w_{i-1},w')} |\{ w' : 0 < c(w_{i-1},w') \} |$

This equation can be extended to n-grams. Let $w_{i-n+1}^{i-1}$ be the $n-1$ words before $w_i$:

$p_{KN}(w_i|w_{i-n+1}^{i-1}) = \frac{\max(c(w_{i-n+1}^{i-1},w_{i}) - \delta,0)}{\sum_{w'} c(w_{i-n+1}^{i-1},w')} + \delta \frac{| \{ w' : 0 < c(w_{i-n+1}^{i-1},w') \} |}{\sum_{w'} c(w_{i-n+1}^{i-1},w')} p_{KN}(w_i|w_{i-n+2}^{i-1})$

This model uses the concept of absolute-discounting interpolation which incorporates information from higher and lower order language models. The addition of the term for lower order n-grams adds more weight to the overall probability when the count for the higher order n-grams is zero. Similarly, the weight of the lower order model decreases when the count of the n-gram is non zero.

== Modified Kneser–Ney smoothing ==
Modifications of this method also exist. Chen and Goodman's 1998 paper lists and benchmarks several such modifications. Computational efficiency and scaling to multi-core systems is the focus of Chen and Goodman’s 1998 modification. This approach is once used for Google Translate under a MapReduce implementation. KenLM is a performant open-source implementation.
