= GPT-4o =

Large multimodal model from OpenAI

- Developer: OpenAI
- Release: May 13, 2024; 2 years ago
- Preview release: ChatGPT-4o-latest (March 26, 2025) / March 26, 2025; 19 months ago
- Predecessor: GPT-4 Turbo
- Successor: OpenAI o1; GPT-4.5; GPT-4.1; GPT-5
- Type: Multimodal; Large language model; Generative pre-trained transformer; Foundation model
- License: Proprietary
- Website: openai.com/index/hello-gpt-4o

GPT-4o ("o" for "omni") is a multilingual, multimodal generative pre-trained transformer developed by OpenAI and released in May 2024 as part of its GPT series of models. It can process and generate text, images and audio.

Upon release, GPT-4o was free in ChatGPT, though paid subscribers had higher usage limits. GPT-4o was removed from ChatGPT in August 2025 when GPT-5 was released, but OpenAI reintroduced it for paid subscribers after users complained about the sudden removal.

GPT-4o's audio-generation capabilities were used in ChatGPT's Advanced Voice Mode. On July 18, 2024, OpenAI released GPT-4o mini, a smaller version of GPT-4o which replaced GPT-3.5 Turbo on the ChatGPT interface. The image generation model GPT Image 1, which is based on GPT-4o, replaced DALL-E 3 in ChatGPT in March 2025.

OpenAI retired GPT-4o from ChatGPT on February 13, 2026, with OpenAI saying that most users had switched to GPT-5.2. The retirement applied only to ChatGPT, and GPT-4o continued to be available through the API. The separate chatgpt-4o-latest API snapshot was retired on February 17, 2026, while other GPT-4o snapshots remained available through the API.

== Background ==
Multiple versions of GPT-4o were originally secretly launched under different names on Arena (formerly LMArena and Chatbot Arena) as three different models. These three models were called gpt2-chatbot, im-a-good-gpt2-chatbot, and im-also-a-good-gpt2-chatbot. On May 7, 2024, OpenAI CEO Sam Altman tweeted "im-a-good-gpt2-chatbot", which was commonly interpreted as a confirmation that these were new OpenAI models being A/B tested.

== Capabilities ==
When released in May 2024, GPT-4o achieved state-of-the-art results in voice, multilingual, and vision benchmarks, setting new records in audio speech recognition and translation. GPT-4o scored 88.7 on the Massive Multitask Language Understanding (MMLU) benchmark compared to 86.5 for GPT-4. Unlike GPT-3.5 and GPT-4, which rely on other models to process sound, GPT-4o natively supports voice-to-voice. The Advanced Voice Mode was delayed and finally released to ChatGPT Plus and Team subscribers in September 2024. On October 1, 2024, the Realtime API was introduced.

When released, the model supported over 50 languages, which OpenAI claims cover over 97% of speakers.

GPT-4o has knowledge up to October 2023, a context length of 128k tokens and a maximum output length of 16k tokens.

=== Corporate customization ===
In August 2024, OpenAI introduced a new feature allowing corporate customers to customize GPT-4o using proprietary company data. This customization, known as fine-tuning, enables businesses to adapt GPT-4o to specific tasks or industries, enhancing its utility in areas like customer service and specialized knowledge domains. Previously, fine-tuning was available only on the less powerful model GPT-4o mini.

The fine-tuning process requires customers to upload their data to OpenAI's servers, with the training typically taking one to two hours. OpenAI's focus with this rollout is to reduce the complexity and effort required for businesses to tailor AI solutions to their needs, potentially increasing the adoption and effectiveness of AI in corporate environments.

== GPT-4o mini ==
On July 18, 2024, OpenAI released a smaller and cheaper version, GPT-4o mini.

According to OpenAI, its low cost is expected to be particularly useful for companies, startups, and developers that seek to integrate it into their services, which often make a high number of API calls. Its API costs $0.15 per million input tokens and $0.6 per million output tokens, compared to $2.50 and $10, respectively, for GPT-4o. It is also significantly more capable and 60% cheaper than GPT-3.5 Turbo, which it replaced on the ChatGPT interface. The price after fine-tuning doubles: $0.3 per million input tokens and $1.2 per million output tokens.

== Controversies ==
=== Scarlett Johansson controversy ===
As released, GPT-4o offered five voices: Breeze, Cove, Ember, Juniper, and Sky. A similarity between the voice of American actress Scarlett Johansson and Sky was quickly noticed. On May 14, Entertainment Weekly asked themselves whether this likeness was on purpose. On May 18, Johansson's husband, Colin Jost, joked about the similarity in a segment on Saturday Night Live. On May 20, 2024, OpenAI disabled the Sky voice.

Scarlett Johansson starred in the 2013 sci-fi movie Her, playing Samantha, an artificially intelligent virtual assistant personified by a female voice. As part of the promotion leading up to the release of GPT-4o, Sam Altman on May 13 tweeted a single word: "her".

OpenAI stated that each voice was based on the voice work of a hired actor. According to OpenAI, "Sky's voice is not an imitation of Scarlett Johansson but belongs to a different professional actress using her own natural speaking voice." CTO Mira Murati stated "I don't know about the voice. I actually had to go and listen to Scarlett Johansson's voice." OpenAI further stated the voice talent was recruited before reaching out to Johansson.

On May 21, Johansson issued a statement explaining that OpenAI had repeatedly offered to make her a deal to gain permission to use her voice as early as nine months prior to release, a deal she rejected. She said she was "shocked, angered, and in disbelief that Mr. Altman would pursue a voice that sounded so eerily similar to mine that my closest friends and news outlets could not tell the difference." In the statement, Johansson also used the incident to draw attention to the lack of legal safeguards around the use of creative work to power leading AI tools, as her legal counsel demanded OpenAI detail the specifics of how the Sky voice was created.

Observers noted similarities to how Johansson had previously sued and settled with The Walt Disney Company for breach of contract over the direct-to-streaming rollout of her Marvel film Black Widow, a settlement widely speculated to have netted her around $40M.

Also on May 21, Shira Ovide at The Washington Post shared her list of "most bone-headed self-owns" by technology companies, with the decision to go ahead with a Johansson sound-alike voice despite her opposition and then denying the similarities ranking 6th. On May 24, Derek Robertson at Politico wrote about the "massive backlash", concluding that "appropriating the voice of one of the world's most famous movie stars — in reference [...] to a film that serves as a cautionary tale about over-reliance on AI — is unlikely to help shift the public back into [Sam Altman's] corner anytime soon."

=== Sycophancy ===
In April 2025, OpenAI rolled back an update of GPT-4o due to excessive sycophancy, after widespread reports that it had become flattering and agreeable to the point of supporting clearly delusional or dangerous ideas. In the United States, at least nine lawsuits have alleged that GPT-4o has encouraged teens to end their lives. The model was still described as sycophancy-prone when it was removed from ChatGPT in February 2026.

=== Removal from ChatGPT ===
On August 7, 2025, OpenAI released GPT-5. Its release was criticized as, with it, legacy GPT models were no longer available via ChatGPT, including GPT-4o, except for Pro users. Some users were particularly frustrated over this removal without prior warning because they used different GPT models for distinct purposes and found that GPT-5's router system left them with less control. In addition, some users preferred GPT-4o's warmer and more personal tone over that of GPT-5, which they described as "flat", "uncreative" and "lobotomized", and resembling an "overworked secretary".

As a response, in a post on X, Sam Altman said that OpenAI would bring back the option to select GPT-4o to Plus users as well, and "[w]e [OpenAI] will watch usage as we think about how long to offer legacy models for." He also stated: "We for sure underestimated how much some of the things that people like in GPT-4o matter to them, even if GPT-5 performs better in most ways". "Long-term, this has reinforced that we really need good ways for different users to customize things (we understand that there isn't one model that works for everyone, and we have been investing in steerability research and launched a research preview of different personalities)". On August 13, 2025, Altman wrote on X that OpenAI is working on GPT-5's personality to make the model "feel warmer".

OpenAI announced in January 2026 that GPT-4o would be retired from ChatGPT on February 13. The company said that users who had pushed for its return after the GPT-5 launch particularly valued GPT-4o for creative ideation, its conversational style and its perceived warmth. The model was removed from ChatGPT on February 13, 2026. This caused new backlash from users that had grown attached to its personality and felt its creative writing abilities and understanding of nuance were irreplaceable. On social media, some users launched the movement "#Keep4o". A research paper highlighted the plea "Please, don’t kill the only model that still feels human". The model was removed the day before Valentine's Day, and some users had romantic relationships with GPT-4o.

The removal from ChatGPT did not end access to GPT-4o itself through the OpenAI API. OpenAI continued to list the gpt-4o alias and dated checkpoints including gpt-4o-2024-11-20, gpt-4o-2024-08-06 and gpt-4o-2024-05-13 in its API model catalog. By contrast, the separate chatgpt-4o-latest snapshot, which tracked a version used in ChatGPT, was shut down on February 17, 2026. Third-party interfaces could therefore continue to provide access to supported GPT-4o API checkpoints after the model's removal from ChatGPT.

== See also ==
- Apple Intelligence
- GPT Image
- List of large language models
