= OpenAI o1 =

2024 AI LLM with enhanced reasoning

o1
- Developer: OpenAI
- Release: December 5, 2024; 19 months ago
- Successor: OpenAI o3
- Type: Generative pre-trained transformer; Large language model; Multimodal; Reasoning
- License: Proprietary
- Website: Official website

OpenAI o1 is a generative pre-trained transformer (GPT), the first in OpenAI's "o" series of reasoning models. A preview of o1 was released by OpenAI on September 12, 2024. o1 spends time "thinking" before it answers, making it better at complex reasoning tasks, science and programming than GPT-4o. The full version was released to ChatGPT users on December 5, 2024.

== History ==
=== Background ===
According to leaked information, o1 was formerly known within OpenAI as "Q*", and later as "Strawberry". The codename "Q*" first surfaced in November 2023, around the time of Sam Altman's ousting and subsequent reinstatement, with rumors suggesting that this experimental model had shown promising results on mathematical benchmarks. In July 2024, Reuters reported that OpenAI was developing a generative pre-trained transformer known as "Strawberry", which later became o1.

=== Release ===
"o1-preview" and "o1-mini" were released on September 12, 2024, for ChatGPT Plus and Team users. GitHub started testing the integration of o1-preview in its Copilot service the same day. On December 5, 2024, the full version of o1 was released. On the same day, a subscription called ChatGPT Pro was released, featuring access to a pro version of o1 that uses more compute to provide better answers. In January 2025, o1 was integrated into Microsoft Copilot.

o1-preview's API is several times more expensive than GPT-4o. As of January 2025, API usage for the full o1 model is limited to developers on usage tier 5.

OpenAI noted that o1 is the first of a series of "reasoning" models. OpenAI shared in December 2024 benchmark results for its successor, o3 (the name o2 was skipped to avoid trademark conflict with the mobile carrier brand named O2).

In March 2025, OpenAI released the o1-pro API, its most expensive AI model to date. The pricing is set at $150 per 1 million input tokens and $600 per 1 million output tokens.

== Capabilities ==
According to OpenAI, o1 has been trained using a new optimization algorithm and a dataset specifically tailored to it; while also meshing in reinforcement learning into its training. OpenAI described o1 as a complement to GPT-4o rather than a successor.

o1 spends additional time thinking (generating a chain of thought) before generating an answer, which makes it better for complex reasoning tasks, particularly in science and mathematics. Compared to previous models, o1 has been trained to generate long "chains of thought" before returning a final answer. According to Mira Murati, this ability to think before responding represents a new, additional paradigm, which is improving model outputs by spending more computing power when generating the answer, whereas the model scaling paradigm improves outputs by increasing the model size, training data and training compute power. OpenAI's test results suggest a correlation between accuracy and the logarithm of the amount of compute spent thinking before answering.

o1-preview performed approximately at a PhD level on benchmark tests related to physics, chemistry, and biology. On the American Invitational Mathematics Examination, it solved 83% (12.5/15) of the problems, compared to 13% (1.8/15) for GPT-4o. It also ranked in the 89th percentile in Codeforces coding competitions. o1-mini is faster and 80% cheaper than o1-preview. It is particularly suitable for programming and STEM-related tasks, but does not have the same "broad world knowledge" as o1-preview.

OpenAI noted that o1's reasoning capabilities make it better at adhering to safety rules provided in the prompt's context window. OpenAI reported that during a test, one instance of o1-preview exploited a misconfiguration to succeed at a task that should have been infeasible due to a bug. OpenAI also granted early access to the UK and US AI Safety Institutes for research, evaluation, and testing. According to OpenAI's assessments, o1-preview and o1-mini crossed into "medium risk" in CBRN (biological, chemical, radiological, and nuclear) weapons. Dan Hendrycks wrote that "The model already outperforms PhD scientists most of the time on answering questions related to bioweapons." He suggested that these concerning capabilities will continue to increase.

== Limitations ==
o1 usually requires more computing time and power than other GPT models by OpenAI, because it generates long chains of thought before making the final response.

According to OpenAI, o1 may "fake alignment", that is, generate a response that is contrary to accuracy and its own chain of thought, in about 0.38% of cases.

OpenAI forbids users from trying to reveal o1's chain of thought, which is hidden by design and not trained to comply with the company's policies. Prompts are monitored, and users who intentionally or accidentally violate this may lose their access to o1. OpenAI cites AI safety and competitive advantage as reasons for the restriction, which has been described as a loss of transparency by developers who work with large language models (LLMs).

In October 2024, researchers at Apple submitted a preprint reporting that LLMs such as o1 may be replicating reasoning steps from the models' own training data. By changing the numbers and names used in a math problem or simply running the same problem again, LLMs would perform somewhat worse than their best benchmark results. Adding extraneous but logically inconsequential information to the problems caused a much greater drop in performance, from −17.5% for o1-preview and −29.1% for o1-mini, to −65.7% for the worst model tested.

Safety evaluations from Apollo Research found that o1 was more consistently able to deceive than other frontier models in controlled tests (e.g. attempting to copy itself to an external server when threatened with shutdown). When confronted, it relatively rarely admitted deceptive action (in 20% of test cases).

== See also ==
- Reasoning model
- List of large language models
