= List of large language models =

A large language model (LLM) is a type of machine learning model designed for natural language processing tasks such as language generation. LLMs are language models with many parameters, and are trained with self-supervised learning on a vast amount of text.

== List ==
For the training cost column, 1 petaFLOP-day equals 1 petaFLOP/sec × 1 day, or 8.64×10^{19} FLOP (floating point operations). Only the cost of the largest model is shown. The number of parameters is measured in billions, (Note: In many cases, researchers release or report on multiple versions of a model having different sizes. In these cases, the size of the largest model is listed here.) and the training cost is measured in petaFLOP-days.

=== 2018 ===
Name	Release date (Note: This is the date that documentation describing the model's architecture was first released.)	Developer	# of params	Corpus size	Training cost	License (Note: License applies only to the pre-trained model weights unless otherwise noted. In many cases, the training code, datasets and post-training data remain proprietary. LLMs may be licensed differently from the chatbots that use them; for the licenses of chatbots, see List of chatbots.)	Notes
GPT-1	Jun 11, 2018	OpenAI	0.117B	Unknown	1	MIT	First GPT model, decoder-only transformer. Trained for 30 days on 8 P600 GPUs.
BERT	Oct 2018	Google	0.340B	3.3B words	9	Apache 2.0	An early and influential language model. Encoder-only and thus not built to be prompted or generative. Training took 4 days on 64 TPUv2 chips.

=== 2019 ===
Name	Release date	Developer	# of params	Corpus size	Training cost	License	Notes
T5	Oct 2019	Google	11B	34B tokens	Unknown	Apache 2.0	Base model for Google projects like Imagen.
XLNet	Jun 2019	Google	0.340B	33B words	330	Apache 2.0	An alternative to BERT; designed as encoder-only. Trained on 512 TPU v3 chips for 5.5 days.
GPT-2	Feb 2019	OpenAI	1.5B	40GB (~10B tokens)	28	MIT	Trained on 32 TPUv3 chips for 1 week.

=== 2020 ===
Name	Release date	Developer	# of params	Corpus size	Training cost	License	Notes
GPT-3	May 2020	OpenAI	175B	300B tokens	3640	Proprietary	A fine-tuned variant of GPT-3, termed GPT-3.5, was made available to the public through ChatGPT in 2022.

=== 2021 ===
Name	Release date	Developer	# of params	Corpus size	Training cost	License	Notes
GPT-Neo	Mar 2021	EleutherAI	2.7B	825 GiB	Unknown	MIT	The first of a series of free GPT-3 alternatives released by EleutherAI. GPT-Neo outperformed an equivalent-size GPT-3 model on some benchmarks, but was significantly worse than the largest GPT-3.
HyperCLOVA	May 2021	Naver	204B; 82B	560B Tokens	Unknown	Unreleased	Its technical report says the model is the "first discovery on near 100B-scale non-English LM" by "constructing a large Korean-centric corpus of 560B tokens."
GPT-J	Jun 2021	EleutherAI	6B	825 GiB	200	Apache 2.0	
Megatron-Turing NLG	Oct 2021	Microsoft and Nvidia	530B	338.6B tokens	38000	Unreleased	Trained for 3 months on over 2000 A100 GPUs on the NVIDIA Selene Supercomputer, for over 3 million GPU-hours.
Ernie 3.0 Titan	Dec 2021	Baidu	260B	4TB	Unknown	Proprietary	
Claude	Dec 2021	Anthropic	52B	400B tokens	Unknown	Proprietary	Fine-tuned for desirable behavior in conversations.
GLaM (Generalist Language Model)	Dec 2021	Google	1162B	1.6T tokens	5600	Proprietary	
Gopher	Dec 2021	Google DeepMind	280B	300B tokens	5833	Proprietary	

=== 2022 ===
Name	Release date	Developer	# of params	Corpus size	Training cost	License	Notes
LaMDA (Language Models for Dialog Applications)	Jan 2022	Google	137B	1.56T words, 168B tokens	4110	Proprietary	
GPT-NeoX	Feb 2022	EleutherAI	20B	825 GiB	740	Apache 2.0	
Chinchilla scaling	Mar 2022	Google DeepMind	70B	1.4T tokens	6805	Proprietary	
PaLM (Pathways Language Model)	Apr 2022	Google	540B	768B tokens	29,250	Proprietary	Trained for ~60 days on ~6000 TPU v4 chips.
OPT (Open Pretrained Transformer)	May 2022	Meta	175B	180B tokens	310	Non-commercial research	GPT-3 architecture with some adaptations from Megatron. The training logbook written by the team was published. The smaller models including 66B are publicly available, while the 175B model is available on request.
YaLM 100B	Jun 2022	Yandex	100B	1.7TB	Unknown	Apache 2.0	
Minerva	Jun 2022	Google	540B	38.5B tokens from webpages filtered for math content and from arXiv	Unknown	Proprietary	For solving "mathematical and scientific questions using step-by-step reasoning".
BLOOM	Jul 2022	Large collaboration led by Hugging Face	175B	350B tokens (1.6TB)	Unknown	Responsible AI	
Galactica	Nov 2022	Meta	120B	106B tokens	Unknown	CC-BY-NC-4.0	
AlexaTM (Teacher Models)	Nov 2022	Amazon	20B	1.3T	Unknown	Proprietary	

=== 2023 ===
Name	Release date	Developer	# of params	Corpus size	Training cost	License	Notes
Llama	Feb 2023	Meta AI	65B	1.4T	6300	Non-commercial research	Facebook's license and distribution scheme restricted access to approved researchers, but the model weights were leaked and became widely available.
Stanford Alpaca	Mar 13, 2023	Stanford University	7B	52K demonstrations	<US$100	Non-commercial	Fine-tuned from LLaMA 7B on instruction-following demonstrations generated using OpenAI's text-davinci-003.
GPT-4	Mar 2023	OpenAI	Unknown	Unknown	Unknown	Proprietary	
Cerebras-GPT	Mar 2023	Cerebras	13B		270	Apache 2.0	
Falcon	Mar 2023	Technology Innovation Institute	40B	1T tokens, from RefinedWeb (filtered web text corpus) plus some "curated corpora".	2800	Apache 2.0	
BloombergGPT	Mar 2023	Bloomberg L.P.	50B	363B tokens from Bloomberg's proprietary data sources, plus 345B tokens from general purpose datasets	Unknown	Unreleased	Designed for financial tasks.
PanGu-Σ	Mar 2023	Huawei	1085B	329B tokens	Unknown	Proprietary	
OpenAssistant	Mar 2023	LAION	17B	1.5T tokens	Unknown	Apache 2.0	
Vicuna	Mar 2023	LMSYS	13B	70K conversations	US$300	Non-commercial	Fine-tuned from LLaMA on user-shared conversations collected from ShareGPT.
Jurassic-2	Mar 2023	AI21 Labs	Unknown	Unknown	Unknown	Proprietary	
PaLM 2 (Pathways Language Model 2)	May 2023	Google	340B	3.6T tokens	85,000	Proprietary	Used in the Bard chatbot.
YandexGPT	May 17, 2023	Yandex	Unknown	Unknown	Unknown	Proprietary	
Phi-1	Jun 21, 2023	Microsoft	1.3B	7B tokens	Unknown	MIT	Trained for 4 days on 8 A100s.
Llama 2	Jul 2023	Meta AI	70B	2T tokens	21,000	Llama 2	Trained over 3.3 million GPU (A100) hours.
Claude 2	Jul 2023	Anthropic	Unknown	Unknown	Unknown	Proprietary	Used in the Claude chatbot.
Granite 13b	Jul 2023	IBM	Unknown	Unknown	Unknown	Proprietary	Used in IBM Watsonx.
Mistral 7B	Sep 2023	Mistral AI	7.3B	Unknown	Unknown	Apache 2.0	
YandexGPT 2	Sep 7, 2023	Yandex	Unknown	Unknown	Unknown	Proprietary	
Claude 2.1	Nov 2023	Anthropic	Unknown	Unknown	Unknown	Proprietary	Used in the Claude chatbot. Has a context window of 200,000 tokens, or ~500 pages.
Grok-1	Nov 2023	xAI	314B	Unknown	Unknown	Apache 2.0	Used in the Grok chatbot. Grok 1 has a context length of 8,192 tokens and has access to X (Twitter).
Gemini 1.0	Dec 2023	Google DeepMind	Unknown	Unknown	Unknown	Proprietary	Multimodal model, comes in three sizes. Used in the chatbot of the same name.
Mixtral 8x7B	Dec 2023	Mistral AI	46.7B	Unknown	Unknown	Apache 2.0	Outperforms GPT-3.5 and Llama 2 70B on many benchmarks. Mixture of experts model, with 12.9 billion parameters activated per token.
DeepSeek-LLM	Nov 29, 2023	DeepSeek	67B	2T tokens	12,000	DeepSeek	Trained on English and Chinese text. Used 10^{24} training FLOPs for 67B model, 10^{b} FLOPs for 7B.
Phi-2	Dec 2023	Microsoft	2.7B	1.4T tokens	419	MIT	Trained on real and synthetic "textbook-quality" data over 14 days on 96 A100 GPUs.

=== 2024 ===
Name	Release date	Developer	# of params	Corpus size	Training cost	License	Notes
Gemini 1.5	Feb 2024	Google DeepMind	Unknown	Unknown	Unknown	Proprietary	Multimodal model based on a MoE architecture. Context window above 1 million tokens.
Gemini Ultra	Feb 2024	Google DeepMind	Unknown	Unknown	Unknown	Proprietary	
Gemma	Feb 2024	Google DeepMind	7B	6T tokens	Unknown	Gemma Terms of Use	
OLMo	Feb 2024	Allen Institute for AI	7B	2T tokens	Unknown	Apache 2.0 (Note: Stack is fully open-source, including training code, datasets and post-training data.)	
Claude 3	Mar 2024	Anthropic	Unknown	Unknown	Unknown	Proprietary	Includes three models: Haiku, Sonnet, and Opus.
DBRX	Mar 2024	Databricks and Mosaic ML	136B	12T tokens	Unknown	Databricks Open Model	
YandexGPT 3 Pro	Mar 28, 2024	Yandex	Unknown	Unknown	Unknown	Proprietary	
Fugaku-LLM	May 2024	Fujitsu, Tokyo Institute of Technology, Tohoku University, RIKEN, etc.	13B	380B tokens	Unknown	Fugaku-LLM Terms of Use	The largest model ever trained on CPU-only, on the Fugaku supercomputer; the model was trained from scratch on 380 billion tokens using 13,824 Fugaku nodes.
Chameleon	May 2024	Meta AI	34B	4.4T	Unknown	Non-commercial research	
Mixtral 8x22B	Apr 17, 2024	Mistral AI	141B	Unknown	Unknown	Apache 2.0	
Phi-3	Apr 23, 2024	Microsoft	14B	4.8T tokens	Unknown	MIT	Marketed by Microsoft as a "small language model".
Granite Code Models	May 2024	IBM	Unknown	Unknown	Unknown	Apache 2.0	
YandexGPT 3 Lite	May 28, 2024	Yandex	Unknown	Unknown	Unknown	Proprietary	
Qwen2	Jun 2024	Alibaba Cloud	72B	3T tokens	Unknown	Various	
DeepSeek-V2	Jun 2024	DeepSeek	236B	8.1T tokens	28,000	DeepSeek	1.4M hours on H800.
Nemotron-4	Jun 2024	Nvidia	340B	9T tokens	200,000	NVIDIA Open Model	Trained for 1 epoch. Trained on 6144 H100 GPUs between December 2023 and May 2024.
Claude 3.5	Jun 2024	Anthropic	Unknown	Unknown	Unknown	Proprietary	Initially, only one model, Sonnet, was released. In October 2024, Sonnet 3.5 was upgraded, and Haiku 3.5 became available.
Llama 3.1	Jul 2024	Meta AI	405B	15.6T tokens	440,000	Llama 3	405B version took 31 million hours on H100-80GB, at 3.8E25 FLOPs.
Grok-2	Aug 14, 2024	xAI	Unknown	Unknown	Unknown	xAI Community License Agreement	Originally closed-source, then re-released as "Grok 2.5" under a source-available license in August 2025.
OpenAI o1	Sep 12, 2024	OpenAI	Unknown	Unknown	Unknown	Proprietary	First LLM described as a "reasoning model".
Sarvam-1	Oct 24, 2024	Sarvam AI	2B	~2T tokens	Unknown	Sarvam AI Research	Supports 10 Indic languages and English
YandexGPT 4 Lite and Pro	Oct 24, 2024	Yandex	Unknown	Unknown	Unknown	Proprietary	
Mistral Large	Nov 2024	Mistral AI	123B	Unknown	Unknown	Mistral Research	Upgraded over time. The latest version is 24.11.
Pixtral	Nov 2024	Mistral AI	123B	Unknown	Unknown	Mistral Research	Multimodal. There is also a 12B version which is under Apache 2 license.
OLMo 2	Nov 2024	Allen Institute for AI	32B	6.6T tokens	15,000	Apache 2.0	
Phi-4	Dec 12, 2024	Microsoft	14B	9.8T tokens	Unknown	MIT	Marketed by Microsoft as a "small language model".
DeepSeek-V3	Dec 2024	DeepSeek	671B	14.8T tokens	56,000	MIT	Used 2.788M training hours on H800 GPUs. Originally released under the DeepSeek License, then re-released under the MIT License as "DeepSeek-V3-0324" in March 2025.
Amazon Nova	Dec 2024	Amazon	Unknown	Unknown	Unknown	Proprietary	Includes three models: Nova Micro, Nova Lite, and Nova Pro.

=== 2025 ===
Name	Release date	Developer	# of params	Corpus size (Note: Expressed in number of tokens, unless otherwise specified)	License	Notes
DeepSeek-R1	Jan 20	DeepSeek	671B	Unknown	MIT	No pretraining; reinforcement-learned upon V3-Base.
Qwen2.5	Jan 26	Alibaba	72B	18T	Various	7 dense models with parameter counts from 0.5B to 72B. Alibaba also released 2 MoE variants.
MiniMax-Text-01	Jan 14	Minimax	456B	4.7T	Minimax Model	
Gemini 2.0	Feb 5	Google DeepMind	Unknown	Unknown	Proprietary	Three models released: Flash, Flash-Lite and Pro.
Grok 3	Feb 19	xAI	Unknown	Unknown	Proprietary	Training cost claimed to be "10x the compute of previous state-of-the-art models".
Claude 3.7	Feb 24	Anthropic	Unknown	Unknown	Proprietary	One model, Sonnet 3.7.
YandexGPT 5 Lite Pretrain and Pro	Feb 25	Yandex	Unknown	Unknown	Proprietary	
GPT-4.5	Feb 27	OpenAI	Unknown	Unknown	Proprietary	OpenAI's largest non-reasoning model at the time.
Gemini 2.5	Mar 25	Google DeepMind	Unknown	Unknown	Proprietary	Three models released: Flash, Flash-Lite and Pro.
YandexGPT 5 Lite Instruct	Mar 31	Yandex	Unknown	Unknown	Proprietary	
Llama 4	Apr 5	Meta AI	400B	40T	Llama 4	
OpenAI o3 and o4-mini	Apr 16	OpenAI	Unknown	Unknown	Proprietary	Reasoning models.
Qwen3	Apr 28	Alibaba Cloud	235B	36T	Apache 2.0	Multiple sizes, the smallest being 0.6B.
Claude 4	May 22	Anthropic	Unknown	Unknown	Proprietary	Includes two models, Sonnet and Opus.
Sarvam-M	May 23	Sarvam AI	24B	Unknown	Apache 2.0	Hybrid reasoning model fine-tuned on Mistral Small base; optimized for math, programming, and Indian languages.
Grok 4	Jul 9	xAI	Unknown	Unknown	Proprietary	
Param-1	Jul 21	BharatGen	2.9B	5T	Apache 2.0	Corpus is "focus[ed] on India’s linguistic landscape".
GLM-4.5	Jul 29	Z.ai	355B	22T	MIT	Released in 355B and 106B sizes. Corpus size was calculated by combining the 15 trillion tokens and the 7 trillion tokens pre-training mix.
GPT-OSS	Aug 5	OpenAI	117B	Unknown	Apache 2.0	Released in 20B and 120B sizes.
Claude 4.1	Aug 5	Anthropic	Unknown	Unknown	Proprietary	Includes one model, Opus.
GPT-5	Aug 7	OpenAI	Unknown	Unknown	Proprietary	Includes three models: GPT-5, GPT-5 mini, and GPT-5 nano. GPT-5 is available in ChatGPT and API. It includes reasoning abilities.
DeepSeek-V3.1	Aug 21	DeepSeek	671B	15.639T	MIT	Corpus size based on DeepSeek V3 (trained on 14.8T tokens); further trained on 839B tokens from the extension phases (630B + 209B). A hybrid model that can switch between thinking and non-thinking modes.
YandexGPT 5.1 Pro	Aug 28	Yandex	Unknown	Unknown	Proprietary	
Apertus	Sep 2	ETH Zurich and EPF Lausanne	70B	15T	Apache 2.0	The first LLM to be compliant with the Artificial Intelligence Act of the European Union.
Claude Sonnet 4.5	Sep 29	Anthropic	Unknown	Unknown	Proprietary	
GLM-4.6	Sep 30	Z.ai	357B	Unknown	Apache 2.0	
Alice AI LLM 1.0	Oct 28	Yandex	Unknown	Unknown	Proprietary	
Gemini 3	Nov 18	Google DeepMind	Unknown	Unknown	Proprietary	Models released: Deep Think and Pro.
Olmo 3	Nov 20	Allen Institute for AI	32B	5.9T	Apache 2.0	Includes 7B and 32B parameter versions, alongside reasoning and instruction-following models.
Claude Opus 4.5	Nov 24	Anthropic	Unknown	Unknown	Proprietary	Largest model in the Claude family.
DeepSeek-V3.2	Dec 1	DeepSeek	685B	Unknown	MIT	Uses a custom DeepSeek Sparse Attention (DSA) mechanism
GPT 5.2	Dec 11	OpenAI	Unknown	Unknown	Proprietary	It was able to solve an open problem in statistical learning theory that had previously remained unresolved by human researchers.
GLM-4.7	Dec 22	Z.ai	355B	Unknown	Apache 2.0	

=== 2026 ===
Name	Release date	Developer	# of params	Corpus size	License	Notes
Qwen3-Max-Thinking	Jan 26	Alibaba Cloud	Unknown	Unknown	Proprietary	Proprietary reasoning model with adaptive tool-use, test-time scaling, and iterative self-reflection.
K2 Think V2	Jan 27	MBUZAI / IFM	70B	12T	Apache 2.0	
Kimi K2.5	Jan 27	Moonshot AI	1T	15T	Modified MIT	Multimodal MoE with 32B active parameters, derived from Kimi K2. Can use "Agent Swarm" technology to coordinate up to 100 parallel sub-agents.
Step 3.5 Flash	Feb 12	StepFun	196B	Unknown	Apache 2.0	MoE model with 11B active parameters out of 196B total
Claude Opus 4.6	Feb 5	Anthropic	Unknown	Unknown	Proprietary	
GPT-5.3-Codex	Feb 5	OpenAI	Unknown	Unknown	Proprietary	
GLM-5	Feb 12	Z.ai	744B	28.5T	MIT	40B active parameters
Qwen3.5	Feb 15	Alibaba Cloud	397B	Unknown	Apache 2.0	17B active parameters
Qwen3.5-Plus	Feb 15	Alibaba Cloud	Unknown	Unknown	Proprietary	
Claude Sonnet 4.6	Feb 17	Anthropic	Unknown	Unknown	Proprietary	
Param-2	Feb 17	BharatGen	17B	22T	BharatGen Research	Mixture-of-experts model, successor of Param-1; many more Indic languages are supported. Trained on H100 GPUs for 24 days.
Sarvam-105B	Feb 18	Sarvam AI	105B	12T	Apache 2.0	India's first independently-trained foundation model; has 105B and 30B versions. Based on mixture-of-experts model, using only 10.3B active parameters at a time. Interprets Indic languages and Hinglish. An early checkpoint of the model was released in January.
Sarvam-30B	Feb 18	Sarvam AI	30B	16T	Apache 2.0	India's first independently-trained foundation model; has 105B and 30B versions. Based on mixture-of-experts model, using only 10.3B active parameters at a time. Interprets Indic languages and Hinglish. An early checkpoint of the model was released in January.
GPT-5.4	Mar 5	OpenAI	Unknown	Unknown	Proprietary	
Mistral Small 4	Mar 17	Mistral AI	119B	Unknown	Apache 2.0	MoE model with 6B active parameters out of 119B total
MiMo-V2-Pro	Mar 18	Xiaomi	1T	Unknown	Proprietary	Mixture-of-experts (MoE) model with more than 1 trillion parameters (43 billion active). Designed for agentic scenarios. Initially available on OpenRouter under the codename "Hunter Alpha" before official release.
Qwen3.6-Plus	Apr 1	Alibaba Cloud	Unknown	Unknown	Proprietary	
Gemma 4	Apr 2	Google DeepMind	31B	Unknown	Apache 2.0	Released in 31B, 26B A4B (3.8B active parameters), E4B (4B effective parameters), and E2B variants
GLM-5.1	Apr 7	Z.ai	744B	28.5T	MIT	40B active parameters
Muse Spark	Apr 8	Meta	Unknown	Unknown	Proprietary	
Qwen3.6	Apr 15	Alibaba Cloud	35B	Unknown	Apache 2.0	MoE model with 3B active parameters out of 35B total
Claude Opus 4.7	Apr 16	Anthropic	Unknown	Unknown	Proprietary	
Kimi K2.6	Apr 20	Moonshot AI	1T	Unknown	Modified MIT	32B active parameters
GPT-5.5	Apr 23	OpenAI	Unknown	Unknown	Proprietary	
Hy3 preview	Apr 23	Tencent	295B	Unknown	Tencent Hy Community	Mixture-of-experts model with 21B active parameters and a 256K-token context window. Preview predecessor to Hy3.
MiMo-V2.5-Pro	Apr 27	Xiaomi	1.02T	48T	MIT	MoE model designed for agentic coding and long-horizon software engineering tasks.
MiMo-V2.5	Apr 27	Xiaomi	310B	27T	MIT	Omni-modal MoE model with agentic capabilities and 1M-token context.
Mistral Medium 3.5	Apr 28	Mistral AI	128B	Unknown	Modified MIT	Mistral AI's flagship model that merges instruction-following, reasoning, and coding into a single 128B dense model
Composer 2.5	May 18	Cursor	1T	Unknown	Proprietary	Agentic coding model available in the Cursor IDE. Built on Kimi K2.5 with additional reinforcement learning; reported 1T total / 32B active parameters.
Gemini 3.5 Flash	May 19	Google DeepMind	Unknown	Unknown	Proprietary	
Qwen3.7-Max	May 20	Alibaba Cloud	Unknown	Unknown	Proprietary	
Claude Opus 4.8	May 28	Anthropic	Unknown	Unknown	Proprietary	
Step 3.7 Flash	May 29	StepFun	198B	Unknown	Apache 2.0	Parameter count is 196B (base) + 1.8B (ViT).
MiniMax-M3	Jun 1	MiniMax	428B	Unknown	MiniMax Community	23B active parameters
Nemotron 3 Ultra	Jun 4	Nvidia	550B	20T	OpenMDW 1.1	55B active parameters
Claude Fable 5	Jun 9	Anthropic	Unknown	Unknown	Proprietary	
Kimi K2.7 Code	Jun 16	Moonshot AI	1T	Unknown	Modified MIT	32B active parameters
GLM-5.2	Jun 16	Z.ai	744B	28.5T	MIT	40B active parameters
LongCat-2.0	Jun 30	Meituan	1.6T	35T	MIT	48B active parameters. Preview version previously released as "Owl Alpha" on OpenRouter.
Hy3	Jul 6	Tencent	295B	Unknown	Apache 2.0	21B active parameters
Grok 4.5	Jul 8	SpaceXAI	Unknown	Unknown	Proprietary	Frontier model for coding, agentic tasks, and knowledge work; trained alongside Cursor. Public availability followed on 9 July 2026.
SWE-1.7	Jul 8	Cognition AI	Unknown	Unknown	Proprietary	Coding model for the Devin agent; trained from a Kimi K2.7 base with Cognition's reinforcement-learning pipeline. Available via Devin (not as open weights).
Muse Spark 1.1	Jul 9	Meta	Unknown	Unknown	Proprietary	
GPT-5.6	Jul 9	OpenAI	Unknown	Unknown	Proprietary	
Inkling	Jul 15	Thinking Machines Lab	975B	45T	Apache 2.0	41B active parameters
Kimi K3	Jul 16	Moonshot AI	2.8T	Unknown	Kimi K3	104B active parameters. Weights released on 27 July.
Qwen3.8	Jul 19	Alibaba Cloud	2.4T	Unknown	Various	Available in 2.4T (95B active parameters) and 27B variants. Preview of Qwen3.8-Max (proprietary variant with image input) was released on 19 July. Weights for 2.4T variant released on 12 August. 27B variant released on 14 August.
Gemini 3.5 Flash Lite	Jul 21	Google DeepMind	Unknown	Unknown	Proprietary	
Gemini 3.6 Flash	Jul 21	Google DeepMind	Unknown	Unknown	Proprietary	
Laguna S 2.1	Jul 21	Poolside AI	118B	Unknown	OpenMDW 1.1	8B active parameters
Motif 3	Jul 21	Motif Technologies	314B	12.5T	MIT	13.2B active parameters. Preview release on 21 July. Official version and weights released on 13 August.
Solar Open 2	Jul 23	Upstage	250B	12T	Upstage Solar	15B active parameters
Fugu-Ultra v1.1	Jul 24	Sakana AI	Unknown	Unknown	Proprietary	Upgraded Fugu-Ultra with stronger coding, agentic, and reasoning benchmarks vs v1.0.
Claude Opus 5	Jul 24	Anthropic	Unknown	Unknown	Proprietary	
A.X K2	Jul 29	SK Telecom	688B	8.2T	Apache 2.0	33B active parameters
Inkling Small	Jul 31	Thinking Machines Lab	276B	Unknown	Apache 2.0	12B active parameters
K-Exaone 2.0	Jul 31	LG	750B	Unknown	Apache 2.0	37B active parameters
DeepSeek-V4-Flash	Jul 31	DeepSeek	284B	32T	MIT	13B active parameters. Preview released on 24 April 2026. Official release on 31 July 2026.
Muse Glimmer	Aug 10	Meta	30B	Unknown	Apache 2.0	
Gemini 3.7 Flash	Aug 13	Google DeepMind	Unknown	Unknown	Proprietary	
DeepSeek-V4-Pro	Aug 13	DeepSeek	1.6T	32T	MIT	49B active parameters. Preview released on 24 April 2026. Official release on 13 August 2026.
GLM-5.3	Aug 14	Z.ai	744B	30T	Various	40B active
GLM-5.3-flash	28 August	Z.ai	320B	30T	MIT	18B active
Hy4 preview	Aug 28	Tencent	770B	Unknown	Apache 2.0	49B active parameters. Preview release.
Claude Mythos 5.1	Sep 1	Anthropic	Unknown	Unknown	Proprietary	
Claude Fable 5.1	Sep 1	Anthropic	Unknown	Unknown	Proprietary	
Gemini 3.8 Flash	Sep 2	Google DeepMind	Unknown	Unknown	Proprietary	
GPT-6 Astra	Sep 3	OpenAI	Unknown	Unknown	Proprietary	
K2 Horizon	Sep 3	MBUZAI / IFM	0.9B to 375B	20T	Apache 2.0	A family of six different models
DeepSeek-V4.1-Flash	Sep 10	DeepSeek	552B	45T	MIT	8B (prefill) and 16B (decode) active parameters.
Grok 4.7	Sep 21	SpaceXAI	Unknown	Unknown	Proprietary	
GPT-6 Sol	Sep 22	OpenAI	Unknown	Unknown	Proprietary	
MiMo-V2.6-Pro	Sep 22	Xiaomi	1.02T	30T	MIT	Native omni-modal models released as part of the MiMo-V2.6 series.
MiMo-V2.6-Flash	Sep 22	Xiaomi	310B	48T	MIT	Native omni-modal models released as part of the MiMo-V2.6 series.
Claude Opus 5.5	Sep 22	Anthropic	Unknown	Unknown	Proprietary	
Claude Sonnet 5.5	Sep 28	Anthropic	Unknown	Unknown	Proprietary	
GPT 6.1	Sep 29	OpenAI	Unknown	Unknown	Proprietary	
Gemini 4 Argon	Sep 30 (Note: Released through the Fairwind Program on 30 September 2026; general launch date was 13 October 2026)	Google DeepMind	Unknown	Unknown	Proprietary	
Mistral Large 4 Preview	Oct 7	Mistral AI	1.05T	Unknown	Unknown	
Kimi K3.1 Pro	Oct 23	Moonshot AI	2.8T	Unknown	Kimi	
Gemini 4 Carbon	Oct 28 (Note: Released through the Fairwind Program on 28 October 2026; general launch date to be announced later)	Google DeepMind	Unknown	Unknown	Proprietary	
Gemini 4 Neon	Nov 19	Google DeepMind	Unknown	Unknown	Proprietary	
Inkling 2 Mini	Nov 20	Thinking Machines Lab	26.4B (3.4B active)	Unknown	Apache 2.0	

== See also ==
- Comparison of deep learning software
- List of AI-assisted software development tools
- List of chatbots
- List of language model benchmarks
- OpenRouter – LLM gateway to multiple AI providers
- Open weights
- Small language model
