= Open-source artificial intelligence =

AI development approach

Open-source artificial intelligence, as defined by the Open Source Initiative, is an AI system that is freely available to use, study, modify, and share. This includes datasets used to train the model, its code, and its model parameters, promoting a collaborative and transparent approach to AI development so someone could create a substantially similar result.

The debate over what should count as 'open-source' given a range of openness among AI projects has been significant. Some large language models touted as open-sourced that are merely open weights and do not release training data and code have been criticized as "openwashing" systems that are mostly closed. For example, Artificial Analysis gives an "Openness Index" of 83% to Nvidia's Nemotron family, for its greater transparency in methodology, pre-training data, and post-training data, while China's frontier open weights models broadly score under 50%.

Open-source AI is a major issue in geopolitics and artificial intelligence controversies, sometimes characterized as an AI arms race or AI Cold War between the US and China. Broadly, models released by Chinese companies, such as DeepSeek, Alibaba Cloud, Moonshot AI and Z.ai, use an open weights framework, under more permissive software licenses like Apache or MIT. United States AI companies, including OpenAI, Anthropic, SpaceXAI, Google DeepMind largely favor a proprietary software framework, especially for larger models. These are in part national government policy decisions, because public access to AI technology has many consequences. Some US politicians have called to restrict US public access to Chinese AI tools.

Popular open-source artificial intelligence project categories include large language models (LLM), machine translation tools, and chatbots. Debate over the benefits and risks of open-sourced AI involve a range of factors like security, privacy and technological advancement. As of July 2026, the largest open weight frontier model is Kimi K3, developed by Moonshot AI, at 2.8 trillion parameters, followed by Alibaba Cloud's Qwen3.8 at 2.4 trillion parameters.

== History ==
The history of open-source artificial intelligence is intertwined with both the development of AI technologies and the growth of the open-source software movement.

=== 1990s: Early development of AI and open-source software ===
The concept of AI dates back to the mid-20th century, when computer scientists like Alan Turing and John McCarthy laid the groundwork for modern AI theories and algorithms. An early form of AI, the natural language processing "doctor" ELIZA, was re-implemented and shared in 1977 by Jeff Shrager as a BASIC program, and soon translated to many other languages. Early AI research focused on developing symbolic reasoning systems and rule-based expert systems.

During this period, the idea of open-source software was beginning to take shape, with pioneers like Richard Stallman advocating for free software as a means to promote collaboration and innovation in programming. The Free Software Foundation, founded in 1985 by Stallman, was one of the first major organizations to promote the idea of software that could be freely used, modified, and distributed. The ideas from this movement eventually influenced the development of open-source AI, as more developers began to see the potential benefits of open collaboration in software creation, including AI models and algorithms.

In the 1990s, open-source software began to gain more traction, the rise of machine learning and statistical methods also led to the development of more practical AI tools. In 1993, the CMU Artificial Intelligence Repository was initiated, with a variety of openly shared software.

=== 2000s: Emergence of open-source AI ===
In the early 2000s open-source AI began to take off, with the release of more user-friendly foundational libraries and frameworks that were available for anyone to use and contribute to.

OpenCV was released in 2000 with a variety of traditional AI algorithms like decision trees, k-Nearest Neighbors (kNN), Naive Bayes and Support Vector Machines (SVM).

=== 2010s: Rise of open-source AI frameworks ===
Open-source deep learning framework as Torch was released in 2002 and made open-source with Torch7 in 2011, and was later augmented by PyTorch, and TensorFlow.

AlexNet was released in 2012.

OpenAI was founded in 2015 with a mission to create open-source artificial intelligence that benefited humanity, at least in part to help with recruitment in the early phases of the organization. GPT-1 was released in 2018.

=== 2020s: Open-weight and open-source generative AI ===
With the announcement of GPT-2 in 2019, OpenAI originally planned to keep the source code of their models private citing concerns about malicious applications. After OpenAI faced public backlash, however, it released the source code for GPT-2 to GitHub three months after its release. OpenAI did not publicly release the source code or pretrained weights for the GPT-3 model. At the time of GPT-3's release, GPT-2 was still the most powerful open source language model in the world. 2022 also saw the rise of larger and more powerful models under licenses of varying openness including Meta's OPT.

The Open Source Initiative consulted experts over two years to create a definition of "open-source" that would fit the needs of AI software and models. The most controversial aspect relates to data access, since some models are trained on sensitive data which can't be released. In 2024, they published the Open Source AI Definition 1.0 (OSAID 1.0). It requires full release of the software for processing the data, training the model and making inferences from the model. For the data, it only requires access to details about the data used to train the AI so others can understand and re-create it.

On August 22, 2022, open-source text-to-image model Stable Diffusion was first released.

In 2023, Meta's weights-available Llama 1 and 2, and Mistral AI's open-weight Mistral and Mixtral models were first released, along with MosaicML's smaller open-source models. The release of the Llama models was a milestone in generating interest in open-weight and open-source models. In 2024, Meta released a collection of large AI models, including Llama 3.1 405B, which was competitive with less open models. Meta's description of Llama as open-source has been disputed due to Llama's software license, which prohibits it from being used for some purposes, and due to Meta not disclosing the origin of the data used to train the models.

DeepSeek released their V3 LLM in December 2024, and their R1 reasoning model on 20 January 2025, both as open-weights models under the MIT license. This release made widely known how China had been embracing using and building more open AI systems as a way to reduce reliance on western software and gatekeeping as well as to help give its industries access to higher-powered AI more quickly. Projects based in China have since become more widely used around the world as well as they have closed at least some of the gap with leading proprietary American models.

Since the release of OpenAI's proprietary ChatGPT model in late 2022, there have been only a few fully open (weights, data, code, etc.) large language models released. In September 2025, a Swiss consortium added to this short list by releasing a fully open model named Apertus.

In December 2025, the Linux Foundation created the Agentic AI Foundation, which assumed control of some open-source agentic AI protocols and other technologies created by OpenAI, Anthropic and Block.

Starting in November 2024, Lightricks began releasing the LTX video models as open weights.

On July 2026, an open letter was published, urging policymakers in the United States to protect open-weight AI models from possible premature restrictions, warning that restricions on open-weight models in the United States would harm competition and drive innovation to other countries. The letter was released jointly by more than 20 companies, including Nvidia, Microsoft, Meta, Palantir, Hugging Face, Perplexity, Mistral, Linux Foundation, Mozilla and IBM.

As of July 2026, the largest open-weight LLM released is Kimi K3, developed by Moonshot AI, at 2.8 trillion parameters. The weights of Alibaba Cloud's Qwen3.8-Max with 2.4 trillion parameters are also expected to be released.

Artificial Analysis gives an "Openness Index" of 83% to Nvidia's Nemotron family, for its greater transparency in methodology, pre-training data, and post-training data, while China's frontier open weights models broadly score under 50%.

== Comparison with open-weights AI ==
The Open Source Initiative distinguishes open-source from open weights artificial intelligence when the materials needed to study and modify the model's development process are not also available.

Comparison of open weights and open-source artificial intelligence
Component	Open weights	Open-source
Weights and biases	Released	Released
Training code	Not shared	Fully shared
Intermediate checkpoints	Withheld	Optional, but desirable
Training dataset	Not shared or disclosed	Released where legally permitted
Training-data composition	Partially disclosed or undisclosed	Fully disclosed

== Significance ==
The label ‘open-source’ can provide real benefits to companies looking to hire top talent or attract customers. The debate around "openwashing” (or calling a project open-source when it is mostly closed) has big implications for the success of various projects within the industry.

Open-source artificial intelligence tends to get more support and adoption in countries and companies that do not have their own leading AI model. These open-source projects can help to undercut the position of business and geopolitical rivals with the strongest proprietary models. Europe is a region pursuing openness as a digital sovereignty strategy to try and reduce the leverage that countries like the United States can use in negotiations on various topics like trade.

== Licenses ==
As of 2025, a plurality (39%) of models released on Hugging Face used the permissive Apache 2.0 License.

Some models, such as the source-available Llama 3, have licenses that grant some of the benefits of open-source licenses, but also contain legal restrictions that deter some companies from using those models, as the companies fear a future lawsuit or a change in the terms and conditions. Some of the same fears also exist in the large number of smaller models that do not specify a license.

== Applications ==
=== Healthcare ===
In the healthcare industry, open-source AI has been used in diagnostics, patient care, and personalized treatment options. Open-source libraries have been used for medical imaging for tasks such as tumor detection, improving the speed and accuracy of diagnostic processes. Additionally, OpenChem, an open-source library specifically geared toward chemistry and biology applications, enables the development of predictive models for drug discovery, helping researchers identify potential compounds for treatment.

=== Military ===
Meta's Llama models, which have been described as open-source by Meta, were adopted by U.S. defense contractors like Lockheed Martin and Oracle after unauthorized adaptations by Chinese researchers affiliated with the People's Liberation Army (PLA) came to light. The Open Source Initiative and others have contested Meta's use of the term open-source to describe Llama, due to Llama's license containing an acceptable use policy that prohibits use cases including non-U.S. military use. Chinese researchers used an earlier version of Llama to develop tools like ChatBIT, optimized for military intelligence and decision-making, prompting Meta to expand its partnerships with U.S. contractors to ensure the technology could be used strategically for national security. These applications now include logistics, maintenance, and cybersecurity enhancements.

=== Private industry ===
Many companies in the private sector have taken up use of open models for their flexibility, greater level of control, opportunities to fine-tune, and lower cost to use. AT&T, Thomson Reuters, Harvey, Nomura Holdings, Goldman Sachs, DoorDash and Accenture are among the companies that have moved at least some of their workload to open models. Some of the reported use cases include software development, specialized tasks such as document review and legal agentic tasks.

== Benefits ==
=== Privacy and independence ===
A Nature editorial suggests medical care could become dependent on AI models that could be taken down at any time, are difficult to evaluate, and may threaten patient privacy. Its authors propose that health-care institutions, academic researchers, clinicians, patients and technology companies worldwide should collaborate to build open-source models for health care of which the underlying code and base models are easily accessible and can be fine-tuned freely with own data sets.

=== Free speech ===
Open-source models are harder to censor than close-sourced ones.

=== Collaboration and faster advancements ===
Large-scale collaborations, such as those seen in the development of open-source frameworks like TensorFlow and PyTorch, have accelerated advancements in machine learning (ML) and deep learning. The open-source nature of these platforms also facilitates rapid iteration and improvement, as contributors from across the globe can propose modifications and enhancements to existing tools.

=== Democratizing access ===
Open-source allows countries and organizations that otherwise do not have access to proprietary models a way to use and invest in AI more cheaply. This can help to create an ecosystem for other businesses to sell services on top of.

=== Transparency ===
A video about the importance of transparency of AI in medicine

One benefit of open-source AI is the increased transparency it offers compared to closed-source alternatives. The open-sourced aspects of models allow those algorithms and code to be inspected, which promotes accountability and helps developers understand how a model reaches its conclusions. Additionally, open-weight models, such as Llama and Stable Diffusion, allow developers to directly access model parameters, potentially facilitating the reduced bias and increased fairness in their applications. This transparency can help create systems with human-readable outputs, or "explainable AI", which is a growingly key concern, especially in high-stakes applications such as healthcare, criminal justice, and finance, where the consequences of decisions made by AI systems can be significant.

== Concerns ==
=== Quality and security ===
Open sourced models have fewer ways to prevent them from being used for malicious activities. Open-source AI may allow bioterrorism groups to remove fine-tuning and other safeguards of AI models. One proposed step towards reducing these kinds of harms could be to require models to have their risks evaluated and pass a certain standard before being released. A July 2024 report by the White House found it did not yet find sufficient evidence to restrict revealing model weights, though a number of experts in 2024 seemed more concerned about future advances than present-day capabilities.

Executives that preferred proprietary models, in 2025, cited security concerns and performance as major factors why.

=== Training costs ===
The cost of training datasets for fully open-sourced models can be prohibitively expensive for many projects.

== See also ==
- Lists of open-source artificial intelligence software
- Artificial intelligence in Wikimedia projects
