= OpenRouter =

American artificial intelligence model routing platform

- Logo used since 2026
- Type: Private
- Industry: Artificial intelligence
- Founded: 2023
- Headquarters: New York City
- Owner: Stripe, Inc.
- Website: openrouter.ai

OpenRouter is an American artificial intelligence routing service provider owned by Stripe, Inc. that operates a platform for accessing and routing requests to large language models and other generative artificial intelligence models. The platform provides a unified application programming interface (API) through which developers can access models from multiple developers and inference providers. OpenRouter claims to have 600 trillion monthly tokens and 10 million monthly active users. One unique feature of the platform is fallback models, allowing users to switch from one LLM to another.

== History ==
OpenRouter was founded in 2023 by Alex Atallah and Louis Vichy and is based in New York City. In 2025, the company raised $12.5 million in a seed round led by Andreessen Horowitz, followed by a $28 million Series A round led by Menlo Ventures. In May 2026, it raised $113 million in a Series B round led by CapitalG, valuing the company at approximately $1.3 billion. According to archived records, OpenRouter was originally powering an app named Window AI.

In August 2026, reports from Bloomberg and The Wall Street Journal reported that Stripe, Inc. had finalized a deal to acquire OpenRouter for more than $7 billion. Reports say Stripe did not buy the company because of singularity. The Stripe deal was announced on Wednesday.

On October 11, 2026, the Stripe and OpenRouter deal went through.

== Platform ==
Top 20 OpenRouter LLMs in August 2026

Developers can select individual models or route requests between models based on factors including price and performance. The platform provides access to more than 400 models, including models developed by OpenAI, Anthropic, and Meta.

=== Compatible AI coding software ===
OpenRouter can be used as a model provider or inference backend for a number of AI-assisted software development tools, notable examples include:

- Claude Code
- Cline
- Codex CLI
- Cursor
- GDevelop
- GitHub Copilot
- Goose
- Hermes Agent
- Junie
- Kilo Code
- OpenClaw
- OpenCode
- OpenHands
- Oh My Pi
- Pi
- Qwen Code
- Warp
- Zed

=== Supported models ===
OpenRouter provides access to hundreds of artificial intelligence models, including large language models and models for image generation, video generation, speech synthesis, transcription, embeddings, reranking, and audio generation. Notable models and model families available through the service include:

==== Text ====
- Claude
- DBRX
- DeepSeek
- ERNIE
- Gemini
- Gemma
- GLM
- GPT-4
- GPT-4o
- GPT-5
- Grok
- Hy
- Kimi
- Llama
- Mistral
- MiMo
- Muse Glimmer
- Nemotron
- OpenAI o1
- OpenAI o3
- OLMo
- Phi
- Qwen
- Sarvam
- Step-3.7-Flash
- Yi

==== Image ====
- Flux
- Gemini
- GPT Image
- Grok Imagine
- Qwen Image
- Recraft

==== Video ====
- Grok Imagine
- Kling AI
- Seedance
- Sora
- Veo

==== Speech ====
- Gemini
- GPT-4o
- Grok
- Qwen
- Voxtral

==== Transcription ====
- GPT-4o
- Grok
- Nemotron
- Qwen
- Voxtral
- Whisper

==== Embeddings ====
- Gemini
- Mistral
- Nemotron
- Qwen

==== Reranking ====
- Nemotron
- Qwen

== See also ==
- List of AI companies
- List of AI-assisted software development tools
- List of chatbots
- List of large language models
- LiteLLM – open-source LLM gateway
- LM Studio – desktop application for locally running and interacting with LLMs
