= Open weights =

Public availability of AI parameters

Open weights are the publicly released learned parameters of a trained artificial intelligence model, principally its weights and biases. In an artificial neural network, weights are numerical values that determine how strongly inputs contribute to the network's calculations. Publishing these values allows others to download and use the model, while permission to modify, fine-tune or redistribute it depends on its license. The term is commonly applied to large language models, diffusion models and other generative artificial intelligence. Open weights is contrasted to open-source artificial intelligence, which considers the public release of not only parameters but the model's source code, training data, evaluation results, intermediate checkpoints and technical documentation.

Open weights AI is a major issue in geopolitics and artificial intelligence controversies, sometimes characterized as an AI arms race or AI Cold War between the US and China. Broadly, models released by Chinese companies, such as DeepSeek, Alibaba Cloud, Moonshot AI and Z.ai, use an open weights framework, under more permissive software licenses like Apache or MIT. United States AI companies, including OpenAI, Anthropic, Google DeepMind, SpaceXAI, and Meta Superintelligence Labs, favor a proprietary software framework, especially for larger models. These are in part national government policy decisions, because public access to AI technology has many consequences. Some US politicians have called to restrict US public access to Chinese AI tools.

Popular open-source artificial intelligence project categories include large language models (LLM), machine translation tools, and chatbots. Debate over the benefits and risks of open-sourced AI involve a range of factors like security, privacy and technological advancement. As of July 2026, the largest open weight frontier model is Kimi K3, developed by Moonshot AI, at 2.8 trillion parameters, followed by Alibaba Cloud's Qwen3.8 at 2.4 trillion parameters. Open weights releases outside China are led by US lab Thinking Machines Lab, Nvidia's Nemotron family, and French Mistral AI.

== Characteristics ==
During training, a neural network adjusts its parameters to improve its output. Weights determine the contribution of inputs to weighted sums, while biases are additional learned values. A model described as having seven billion parameters contains roughly seven billion learned values.

== Model openness ==
Releasing model weights may form part of a broader effort to make an artificial intelligence model more transparent and reproducible. The Model Openness Framework evaluates whether components such as the model's parameters, source code, training data, evaluation results, intermediate checkpoints and technical documentation are publicly available under an open license. Under the framework, releasing only the final weights represents a lower degree of openness than releasing the materials needed to study, modify and reproduce the model.

== Model cards ==
A model card is a document accompanying a trained machine learning model that describes a model’s intended uses, limitations, training data and evaluation results. On Hugging Face, model cards are stored as Markdown README.md files with additional metadata in each model repository, helping users evaluate a model before downloading or deploying it.

== Comparison with open-source AI ==
The Open Source Initiative distinguishes open weights from open-source artificial intelligence when the materials needed to study and modify the model's development process are not also available.

Comparison of open weights and open-source artificial intelligence
| Component | Open weights | Open-source |
|---|---|---|
| Weights and biases | Released | Released |
| Training code | Not shared | Fully shared |
| Intermediate checkpoints | Withheld | Optional, but desirable |
| Training dataset | Not shared or disclosed | Released where legally permitted |
| Training-data composition | Partially disclosed or undisclosed | Fully disclosed |

== Benefits and concerns ==
Open weights can support local deployment, customization, independent research and competition without requiring access through the original developer's API. However, widely distributed weights generally cannot be withdrawn and may be modified to remove safeguards. A 2024 report by the National Telecommunications and Information Administration examined these benefits and risks and recommended continued monitoring rather than immediate restrictions.

Professors Peter Henderson and Mark Lemley argue that open-weight license terms are largely unenforceable because they presuppose intellectual property rights in ML model weights that do not exist. Whereas computer programs are typically copyrightable because they are "derived from a human-written copyrightable expression of an idea", model weights are generated automatically by a machine learning algorithm. The functional nature of ML model weights likely precludes copyright protection as well. A whitepaper published by the Intellectual Property Owners Association in 2020 proposes a sui generis right in trained AI models.

== Open-weight large language models ==
As of August 2026, the largest open weights models, with over a trillion parameters, are predominantly released by the AI industry in China, led by the larger Alibaba Cloud (Qwen3.8, 2.4T) and Deepseek (V4, 1.6T), and AI tigers including Moonshot AI (Kimi K3, 2.8T) and Z.ai (GLM-5.3, 753B). The largest models outside China are released by Thinking Machines Lab (Inkling, 975B), Nvidia (Nemotron 3 Ultra, 550B), and Mistral AI (Mistral Large 3, 675B).

The following is a list of notable large language models and model families for which at least one version has been released with publicly accessible weights.

- BLOOM — BigScience
- DBRX — Databricks
- DeepSeek — DeepSeek
- Falcon — TII
- Gemma — Google DeepMind
- GLM — Z.ai
- GPT-OSS — OpenAI
- Granite — IBM
- Hy4 — Tencent
- Inkling — Thinking Machines Lab
- Jamba — AI21 Labs
- Kimi — Moonshot AI
- Laguna S — Poolside AI
- Llama — Meta AI
- MiniMax — MiniMax Group
- Mistral — Mistral AI
- Muse Glimmer — Meta AI
- Nemotron — Nvidia
- OLMo — Allen Institute for AI
- Phi — Microsoft
- Qwen — Alibaba Cloud
- Step — StepFun

== See also ==
- Comparison of free and open-source software licenses
- Creative Commons license
- Foundation model
- Lists of open-source artificial intelligence software
- List of proprietary artificial intelligence software
- List of open-source software organizations
- Model Context Protocol — open standard and open-source framework introduced by Anthropic for LLMs
- Open data
- Source-available software
