= Prime Intellect =

American AI company (founded 2024)

Prime Intellect, Inc.
- Type: Private
- Industry: Artificial intelligence, Cloud computing
- Founded: January 2024; 2 years ago
- Founder: Vincent Weißer; Johannes Hagemann
- Headquarters: San Francisco, California, United States
- Key people: Vincent Weißer (CEO); Johannes Hagemann (CTO)
- Products: Compute Exchange; PRIME Framework; PRIME-RL; prime CLI & SDK; Prime Agent; INTELLECT models
- Website: www.primeintellect.ai

Prime Intellect, Inc. is an American artificial intelligence (AI) infrastructure and computing technology company headquartered in San Francisco, California. The company develops decentralized computing software designed to aggregate distributed GPU infrastructure, enabling multi-node training, reinforcement learning (RL), and autonomous agent execution over the internet.

== History ==
Prime Intellect was co-founded in January 2024 by Vincent Weißer, a German decentralized science (DeSci) entrepreneur, and Johannes Hagemann, a machine learning engineer formerly with Aleph Alpha. The company was established to create an open alternative to centralized cloud clusters by pooling computing capacity across data centers, cloud providers, and individual hardware owners. The company takes its name from The Metamorphosis of Prime Intellect, a 1994 science fiction novella by Roger Williams concerning a superintelligent AI.

=== Funding ===
In April 2024, Prime Intellect raised $5.5 million in a seed funding round co-led by Distributed Global and CoinFund, with participation from Hugging Face CEO Clem Delangue, Protocol Labs founder Juan Benet, and Balaji Srinivasan.

In February 2025, the company secured a $15 million funding round led by Founders Fund, with participation from Menlo Ventures and individual investors including Andrej Karpathy, Emad Mostaque, and Tri Dao.

In July 2026, Prime Intellect announced a $130 million Series A funding round led by Radical Ventures, with participation from NVIDIA Ventures, Intel Capital, Dell Technologies Capital, and existing investors. The company said the funding brought its total funding to more than $150 million; TechCrunch reported a valuation of $1 billion.

== Technology and frameworks ==
Prime Intellect develops open software components for distributed training and autonomous model execution:

- Compute Exchange: A peer-to-peer marketplace that aggregates and schedules compute resources across globally distributed cloud providers and data centers.
- PRIME Framework: A fault-tolerant training framework incorporating dynamic process management and communication optimizations to coordinate model training over internet-connected nodes.
- PRIME-RL: An open-source framework for distributed asynchronous reinforcement learning and post-training.
- prime CLI and SDK: The official command-line tool and Python SDK for managing GPU compute allocations, remote sandboxes, and reinforcement learning environments.
- Prime Agent: An open-source research and coding agent harness (prime-agent) developed as a hard fork of pi-mono, a coding agent harness maintained by Earendil Works. Built around a Recursive Language Model (RLM) architecture and a Continual Harness, it uses a persistent IPython kernel through which agents can access their history, sub-agents, tools, prompts, skills, and memory. In Prime Intellect's autonomous-research experiments, agents using the harness used the persistent kernel to build research workflows and supporting tools during their runs. Prime Intellect notes that, at the time of its evaluation, no model had been trained specifically around Prime Agent or its core features, and argues that model–harness co-training could yield further performance gains.

== Open models and autonomous research ==
In November 2024, Prime Intellect released INTELLECT-1, a 10-billion-parameter open-weights language model trained across 14 distributed nodes across three continents.

In May 2025, Prime Intellect released INTELLECT-2, a 32-billion-parameter model trained through globally distributed reinforcement learning using a fully asynchronous training system and heterogeneous compute resources.

In November 2025, Prime Intellect released INTELLECT-3, a 106-billion-parameter mixture-of-experts model with 12 billion active parameters, trained with supervised fine-tuning and large-scale reinforcement learning. Its training infrastructure was orchestrated across 512 NVIDIA H200 GPUs across 64 interconnected nodes.

In 2026, Prime Intellect expanded its focus from distributed model training to infrastructure for post-training, reinforcement learning, evaluation, and autonomous AI agents. The company introduced its Lab platform, expanded its Environments Hub and verifiers infrastructure, and developed Prime Agent around Recursive Language Models (RLMs) and long-running autonomous workflows.

In August 2026, Prime Intellect published an empirical study evaluating how well frontier AI models can conduct machine-learning research autonomously, motivated by the increasing claims of recursive self-improvement and the lack of convincing evaluations of autonomous research. The study used the nanoGPT optimizer speedrun as a testbed because its tight feedback loop and hill-climbing structure allow research capabilities to be evaluated through repeated experiments. Prime Intellect ran 153 autonomous trials across 18 frontier models, using 8×H200 GPU nodes and agent harnesses such as prime-agent, with internet access disabled during the runs. The best validated results reached 2,726 steps for Fable 5, 2,920 for Opus 5, and 2,930 for Kimi K3, compared with a human record of 2,600 steps at the time of the experiment. The study found substantial differences between models in experiment selection, execution, and interpretation of noisy results. Prime Agent also allowed agents to develop persistent research workflows and supporting tools during the experiments, including experiment drivers, analysis utilities, and simulators. None of the runs produced a fundamentally new method, although the strongest models substantially outperformed the others; Prime Intellect said it remained surprised by the lack of genuinely new ideas despite the models' apparent ability to reason deeply about the systems they were modifying.
