= Apertus =

Apertus may refer to:

- Lee Data, formerly known as Apertus Technologies, Inc.
- Apertus (LLM), a large language model by the Swiss National AI Initiative
