= Death clock calculator =

Hypothetical predictive algorithm

The death clock calculator is a conceptual idea of a predictive algorithm that uses personal socioeconomic, demographic, or health data (such as gender, age, or BMI) to estimate a person's lifespan and provide an estimated time of death.

== Research ==
In December 2023, Nature Computational Science published a paper introducing the life2vec algorithm, developed as part of a scientific research project. Life2vec is a transformer-based model, similar to those used in natural language processing (e.g., ChatGPT or Llama), trained to analyze life trajectories. The project leverages rich registry data from Denmark, covering six million individuals, with event data related to health, demographics, and labor, recorded at a day-to-day resolution. While life2vec aims to provide insights into early mortality risks and life trends, it does not predict specific death dates, and it is not publicly available as of 2024.

Some media outlets and websites misrepresented the intent of life2vec by calling it a death clock calculator, leading to confusion and speculation about the capabilities of the algorithm.
