= Upstage (company) =

South Korean artificial intelligence company

Upstage Co., Ltd.
- Native name: 주식회사 업스테이지
- Type: Private
- Industry: Artificial intelligence
- Founded: October 2020; 6 years ago
- Founder: Sung Kim
- Headquarters: Yongin, South Korea
- Products: Solar Pro 2
- Website: upstage.ai

Upstage Co., Ltd. (Korean: 주식회사 업스테이지) is a South Korean artificial intelligence company founded in 2020.

== History ==
Upstage was established in 2020 by Sung Kim, a former professor at the Hong Kong University of Science and Technology. Kim also led Naver's Clova team before founding the company. Upstage secured 31.6 billion won in Series A funding in 2021, followed by 100 billion won in Series B funding in 2024. The funding received support from SoftBank Ventures Asia, Korea Development Bank, KT Corporation, and Mirae Asset Venture Investment.

== Models ==
In December 2023, Upstage introduced Solar, a small language model with 10.7 billion parameters. Solar Pro 2 was released in July 2025, marking South Korea’s first large language model recognized as a frontier model. The company released Solar Open 2 under the Upstage Solar License in July 2026.

== See also ==
- List of artificial intelligence companies
