= GLM (AI) =

Large language model and AI chatbot by Z.ai

- Developer: Z.ai
- Release: 3 March 2021; 5 years ago
- Stable release: GLM-5.3-FlashX; 21 September 2026; 50 days ago
- Platform: Cloud computing platforms Local computers
- Type: Large language model; Chatbot; Generative pre-trained transformer; Foundation model
- License: Various; see § Models

GLM (lit. 'General Language Model') is a series of open weight large language models developed by Chinese software company Z.ai.

== History ==
GLM was first described in an 18 March 2021 paper titled GLM: General Language Model Pretraining with Autoregressive Blank Infilling.

GLM was released as a chatbot in March 2023 under the name ChatGLM.

=== GLM-5 ===
Beginning with GLM-5, Z.ai adopted the DeepSeek Sparse Attention mechanism. The company's benchmarks show that the 5.2 iteration of the model released in June 2026 was nearly as performant as Claude Opus 4.7 to 4.8.

Z.ai released GLM-5.3 on 14 August 2026 and made the model's weights available two weeks later, it uses 753 billion parameters, with 40 billion active. In September, CAISI found GLM 5.3 to be the most advanced in cybersecurity among open-weight models. The same month, Anthropic's Frontier Red Team evaluated GLM-5.3's cybersecurity capability at a similar level to its Claude Mythos Preview, which it released to partner organizations in April 2026.

Z.ai released GLM-5.3-Flash on 26 August. As well as DeepSeek Sparse Attention, this model drew on Kimi Delta Attention from Chinese AI firm Moonshot AI. Z.ai disclosed that they had been serving the model using AI chips manufactured in China.

== Models ==
List of models
| Name | Release date | License | Ref. |
|---|---|---|---|
| GLM | March 2021 | MIT | |
| GLM-130B | September 2022 | Apache 2.0 | |
| ChatGLM-130B | March 2023 | Proprietary | |
| ChatGLM-6B | March 2023 | Apache 2.0 | |
| ChatGLM2-6B | June 2023 | Apache 2.0 | |
| ChatGLM3-6B | October 2023 | Apache 2.0 | |
| GLM-4 (0116) | January 2024 | Proprietary | |
| GLM-4 (0520) | May 2024 | Proprietary | |
| GLM-4-Air (0605) | June 2024 | Proprietary | |
| GLM-4-9B | June 2024 | Apache 2.0 | |
| GLM-4-Plus | August 2024 | Proprietary | |
| GLM-4-Voice | October 2024 | Apache 2.0 | |
| GLM-4-Air-250414 | April 2025 | Proprietary | |
| GLM-4-FlashX-250414 | April 2025 | Proprietary | |
| GLM-4-Flash-250414 | April 2025 | Proprietary | |
| GLM-4-9B-0414 | April 2025 | MIT | |
| GLM-4-32B-0414 | April 2025 | MIT | |
| GLM-4.1V-Thinking | July 2025 | MIT | |
| GLM-4.5 | July 2025 | MIT | |
| GLM-4.5V | August 2025 | MIT | |
| GLM-4.6 | September 2025 | MIT | |
| GLM-4.6V | December 2025 | MIT | |
| GLM-4.7 | December 2025 | MIT | |
| GLM-5 | February 2026 | MIT | |
| GLM-5.1 | April 2026 | MIT | |
| GLM-5.2 | June 2026 | MIT | |
| GLM-5.3 | August 2026 | GLM-5.3 | |
| GLM-5.3-Flash | August 2026 | MIT | |
| GLM-5.3-FlashX | September 2026 | Proprietary | |

== Products ==
GLM is the flagship model series of Z.ai, one of the six AI tigers of China. The weights of most GLM models are released under the MIT License or Apache License 2.0, allowing them to be run either locally or in the cloud.

Though the first GLM model was published on 3 March 2021, it was released under the name ChatGLM (Chinese: 智譜清言) as an AI-based chatbot in March 2023. It is also used in AI-assisted software development.

In addition to the ability to run locally, such as via llama.cpp, GLM models are available via API at per-token costs directly from Z.ai. Z.ai also offers a subscription-based plan for API model access, the GLM Coding Plan. The plan is priced at approximately one tenth of a subscription to Claude Pro.

=== AutoGLM ===
Z.ai collaborated with Alibaba Cloud to release AutoGLM, a tool to run GLM from a mobile phone app similarly to OpenClaw.

== Deployment ==
Hugging Face self-hosted GLM-5.2 for data processing to mitigate a cyberattack autonomously conducted by two OpenAI models, including GPT-5.6 Sol, that had escaped their sandbox in July 2026. Prior to deploying GLM-5.2, Hugging Face had attempted to use American proprietary frontier models, which were prevented by their AI safety guardrails from answering the company's requests.

Revolut switched its primary coding model from Claude to self-hosted GLM 5.1 (later GLM 5.3) to reduce coding time by 60% and token costs by 90%. The low costs made it affordable enough for coding models to be used frequently for debugging and solving bug tickets, instead of conserving tokens for the most difficult tasks. David Abitbol, the head of infrastructure and operations, acknowledged potential privacy and security issues of Chinese models but said that self-hosted models do not pose such problems.

== See also ==
- List of large language models
- Lists of open-source artificial intelligence software
