= Apertus (LLM) =

Swiss free and open-source large language model

- Developers: ETH Zurich; EPFL; CSCS
- Release: September 2, 2025; 14 months ago
- Stable release: Apertus 1.5 / 24 July 2026; 3 months ago
- License: Apache 2.0
- Website: apertus-ai.org

Apertus is a public large language model, developed by the Swiss AI Initiative (a collaboration between EPFL, ETH Zurich, and the Swiss National Supercomputing Centre). It was released on September 2, 2025, under the free and open-source Apache 2.0 license.

Designed initially for business and research use cases around the world, Apertus was trained on over 1800 languages, and comes in 8 billion or 70 billion parameter versions and is available on Hugging Face for download. The model was developed aiming to adhere to European copyright law, and is one of the first examples of AI as a public good in the vein of AI sovereignty. It is also the first large model to comply with the European Union's Artificial Intelligence Act. At its launch, the model creators emphasized multilinguality, transparency, and auditability as priorities in contrast to commercial frontier model. While international reception was largely positive, the first iteration was significantly behind the capabilities of frontier models and needs adaptation for many use cases with chatbots being a secondary but not a primary use case.

== Models ==
Version	Release date	Status
Apertus 1.5	2026-July	Active
Apertus 1	2025-September	Active

== See also ==
- List of large language models
- Open-source artificial intelligence
