= Phi (language model) =

Microsoft free and open-source large language model

- Developer: Microsoft
- Release: June 21, 2023; 3 years ago
- License: MIT
- Website: azure.microsoft.com/products/phi/

Phi is a series of small language models developed by Microsoft that are open-weights and can run locally on one's device.

The initial version, Phi-1, released in June 2023. Phi-3 was released in April 2024. Phi-4-reasoning-vision-15B was released in March 2026.

The New York Times considered Phi-3-mini to be Microsoft's push into smaller large language models. Phi-3-mini has 3.8 billion parameters. Phi-3-mini has been compared to GPT-3.5 in terms of capability.

== History ==
On June 21, 2023, Microsoft released Phi-1 with 1.3 billion parameters.

In April 2024, Microsoft released Phi-3-mini as an open-weights model with 3.8 billion parameters. Phi-3-mini is capable of running on a phone.

In March 2026, Phi-4-reasoning-vision-15B was released, with the capability of deciding when to reason.

== Models ==
=== Phi-3-mini ===
Phi-3-mini was released in April 2024. It has 3.8 billion parameters and it was released into Azure. It is also capable of running on a phone.

The New York Times considered Phi-3-mini to be Microsoft's push into smaller language models. WIRED and Ars Technica considered Phi-3-mini to be of similar quality to GPT-3.5.

=== Phi-4-reasoning-vision-15B ===
Phi-4-reasoning-vision-15B was released in March 2026. It is capable of deciding when to provide a reasoning process before answering the user prompt, and when to skip reasoning. It has 15 billion parameters, and is a vision-language model.

== See also ==
- List of large language models
- Lists of open-source artificial intelligence software
