= Openwashing =

Term to describe presenting something as open

Openwashing or open washing (a compound word modeled on "whitewash" and derived from "greenwashing") is a term to describe presenting something as open, when it is not actually open. In the context of openwashing, "open" refers to transparency, access to information, participation, and knowledge sharing.

== Usage ==
The term was coined by Michelle Thorne, an Internet and climate policy scholar, in 2009. Thorne used Berlin Partner as an example of openwashing when their marketing campaign featured the slogan "be open. be free. be Berlin," despite terms of use that contradict principles of openness.

In 2016, openwashing was discussed at the Open Exchange for Social Change Unconference in Madrid. This familiarized international scholars to the term but did not result in a universal or changed definition.

Evgeny Morozov criticized the term openwashing because of its failure to concretely define what openness means. Morozov argued that with many definitions of openness, open source, and open data, openwashing can be used in many contexts and "helps us question the authenticity of open initiatives" but does not indicate the barrier to openness itself.

== Types of openwashing ==
=== Open Weights vs Open Source ===
Organizations may promote software or artificial intelligence models as "Open source" while attaching license terms that violate open source-definitions. Meta's LLama models and similar AI products release downloadable parameters ("weights") while restricting use, data access, or user demographics. This violates the Open Source Definition.

=== Selective Disclosure and Decoupling ===
In public administration and corporate transparency, openwashing commonly takes the form of decoupling. Public institutions or corporations may publish large volumes of data to appear transparent while keeping sensitive operations secret.

=== Open-Core & Re-licensing ===
Under the "open-core" business model, software vendors use open-source licenses to build communities, while locking critical features behind proprietary paywalls. A similar practice occurs when companies build platforms using community open-source contributions and transition the software to restrictive "source-available" while continuing to market the product as open branding.

== Openwashing by governments ==
Ana Brandusescu of the World Wide Web Foundation wrote that governments practice openwashing "when information released about government contracts is not detailed enough for the public to have a full picture of what that contract means." This could mean excluding information about how governments decide who contracts are awarded to or how money was spent after allocation.

Maximilian Heimstädt researched open data initiatives in New York City, London, and Berlin to study possible cases of openwashing. Heimstädt found that in all three cities, governments published non-sensitive data to project an image of transparency, while holding back sensitive or risky information to maintain secrecy. This selective disclosure form of openwashing is known as decoupling.

== Examples of openwashing in private industry ==
=== VMWare and Microsoft ===
In 2012, Red Hat Inc. accused VMWare Inc. and Microsoft Corp. of openwashing in relation to their cloud products. Red Hat stated that VMWare and Microsoft were marketing their cloud products using the term "open" although the software was not licensed under an open-source license. Around 2012, one example of non-open-source terms in the license was the addition of a requirement to pay fees for the use of virtual machines running on its cloud products.

=== Llama ===
Since 2023, Meta has described its Llama large language model as open-source, which has been disputed by the Open Source Initiative (OSI) and some academics and journalists. The OSI stated that Llama's licenses do not meet several provisions of its policy document The Open Source Definition (OSD), which prohibits open-source software licenses from discriminating against "persons or groups" and "fields of endeavor", and accused Meta of openwashing Llama. According to the OSI, Llama 2's license prevented the software from being used commercially in some cases and restricted use in fields including controlled substances and critical infrastructure, while later versions of Llama's license also disallowed use by any individual in the European Union. In November 2024, a Nature article asserted that describing Llama 3 as "open" is a case of "'openwashing' systems that are better understood as closed", as Llama 3 provides "little more than an API or the ability to download a model subject to distinctly non-open use restrictions".

== Regulation ==
In the 2000s and 2010s, there were no explicitly defined regulations or bans of openwashing. Some regulations surrounding deceptive marketing may legally prevent openwashing. For example, in the United States, the Federal Trade Commission protects customers from fraud and deceptive messaging. In Canada, the Competition Act prevents businesses from misleading or deceiving customers about their products and services, including about their open business practices.

Other forms of "washing" have caused legal action to be taken. In 2022, international fast fashion company H&M was sued by Chelsea Commodore for greenwashing, with ongoing reviews of other fast fashion companies by domestic competition bureaus potentially causing further legal action.

== See also ==
- -washing
