= Poolside AI =

American artificial intelligence company

- Industry: Artificial intelligence
- Founded: 2023; 3 years ago
- Headquarters: San Francisco, United States
- Key people: Jason Warner (President and Co-Founder); Eiso Kant (CTO and Co-Founder)
- Products: Generative AI
- Website: poolside.ai

Poolside AI (or Poolside) is an American artificial intelligence company that develops large language models for computer software and coding applications.

== History ==
Poolside AI was founded in early 2023 by Jason Warner, former CTO of GitHub, and Eiso Kant, a software entrepreneur. The company started with a work from home model and had employees in the United States, United Kingdom and France.

The first phase of Poolside's Project Horizon, a 2-gigawatt artificial intelligence campus located in Pecos County, Texas, started in October 2025. The data center will be one of the largest in the United States.

As of December 2025, Poolside has 150 employees worldwide. It is headquartered in San Francisco and invites its employees to a monthly concentrated work week at its Paris branch.

=== Funding ===
Within its first year, Poolside secured seed funding of $26 million, followed by an additional $100 million funding round. In October 2024, the company raised $500 million in a Series B funding round led by Bain Capital, DST Global and eBay, among others, which brought its valuation to $3 billion. Poolside had shown a demonstration of its code assistant to these investors using the prompt "Write me the code for a snake video game in python".

In October 2025, Nvidia announced that it would invest up to $1 billion in Poolside which would quadruple its valuation to $12 billion.

== Models ==
Poolside released the 118-billion-parameter open-weights large language model Laguna S 2.1 in July 2026 under the OpenMDW license. At the time of release, co-CEO Warner stated that the company intended to develop larger models.

== Partnerships ==
In December 2024, Poolside and Amazon Web Services (AWS) announced a partnership to provide AI products on Amazon Bedrock and Amazon Elastic Compute Cloud. This partnership allows businesses to deploy Poolside's foundation models within their existing AWS environment.

Poolside has signed contracts with the United States Department of Defense, RTX Corporation, and other companies in the American defense industrial base, while working to sell its autonomous software development engine to Israeli defense companies.

== Activity ==
The company competes in two sectors with other AI companies, building both large language models and autonomous development products. Poolside's software uses natural-language prompts from developers to create and test code, and the company's models are specifically designed for software development instead of general tasks. A system called Model Factory is used to train Poolside's models and evaluate the outcome of the training.
