= Nemotron =

Family of artificial intelligence models developed by Nvidia

- Developer: Nvidia
- Release: November 15, 2023; 2 years ago
- Type: Large language model
- License: Various; Nvidia Open Model License
- Website: developer.nvidia.com/topics/ai/nemotron
- Repository: github.com/NVIDIA-NeMo/Nemotron

Nemotron is a family of artificial intelligence models developed by Nvidia. It includes large language models and multimodal models intended for reasoning, computer programming, information retrieval and agentic AI applications. Nvidia has released open model weights, training data, software and training methods for parts of the family.

== History ==
Nvidia introduced the Nemotron-3 8B models in November 2023 for enterprise generative artificial intelligence applications. Nemotron-4 340B followed in June 2024 and included base, instruction-tuned and reward models designed partly for generating synthetic data.

Nvidia later introduced Llama Nemotron, a series of reasoning models derived from Meta's Llama models. In December 2025, Nvidia announced the Nemotron 3 generation, beginning with Nemotron 3 Nano. Nemotron 3 Super and Ultra were released in 2026.

== Models ==
Major model families
Family	Released	Purpose
Nemotron-3	2023	Enterprise applications
Nemotron-4	2024	Synthetic-data generation
Llama Nemotron	2025	Llama-based reasoning
Nemotron 3	2025	Agentic AI

The Nemotron 3 models use a hybrid architecture combining Mamba, Transformer, and mixture of experts components. So far, the number of active parameters is always 1/10 of total parameters.

Nemotron 3 models
Nemotron	Model	Released	Parameters (total, in billions)	Intended use
3	Nano	2025.12.15	30	Efficient agents
3	Super	2026.3.11	120	Agentic reasoning
3	Nano Omni	2026.4.28	30	Multimodal agents
3	Ultra	2026.6.4	550	Complex reasoning
3.5	Lightning	2026.8.11	30	Fast agents

Nano Omni supports text, image, video and audio input. Nemotron models can be downloaded for local deployment or accessed through Nvidia's application programming interfaces and NIM inference services.

== Nemotron Coalition ==
Nvidia launched the Nemotron Coalition on March 16, 2026, at its GPU Technology Conference (GTC) as a collaboration between open model builders and AI developers. The first project is a base model, to be co-developed by Mistral AI and Nvidia for a future Nemotron 4 family (distinct from the 2024 release of Nemotron-4 340B). Mistral AI and Nvidia previously collaborated on Mistral NeMo 12B, an open-weight model trained on Nvidia DGX cloud and released in July 2024.

Nvidia is to contribute an undisclosed quantity of DGX cloud compute to train the base model. The eight founding members (with anticipated contributions according to Nvidia) were Black Forest Labs (multimodal capabilities), Cursor (coding benchmarks and evaluation datasets), LangChain (tool use and long-horizon reasoning), Mistral AI (customizable models), Perplexity AI (AI systems), Reflection AI (open systems), Sarvam AI (sovereign language AI development), and Thinking Machines Lab (data collaboration). In June 2026, Nvidia announced that four additional companies would join the coalition: H Company, Naver Cloud, Nous Research (maker of Hermes Agent), and Prime Intellect.

== See also ==
- List of AI-assisted software development tools
- List of large language models
- Lists of open-source artificial intelligence software
- Open weights
