= Vicuna LLM =

Large language model fine-tuned from Llama

Vicuna
- Developer: LMSYS
- Release: March 30, 2023; 3 years ago
- Stable release: v1.5 / August 1, 2023; 3 years ago
- Type: Large language model
- License: Code: Apache License 2.0; v1.5 weights: Llama 2 Community License
- Repository: github.com/lm-sys/FastChat

Vicuna LLM is a large language model (LLM) released by LMSYS. The first versions were fine-tuned from Meta's LLaMA. Version 1.5 was fine-tuned from Llama 2. Its training and serving code is open source, and the model has been used in AI research. LMSYS also ran a public online demo of the model for non-commercial use.

The methodology of LMSYS's Chatbot Arena is to enable the public at large to contrast and compare the accuracy of LLMs "in the wild" (an example of citizen science) and to vote on their output; a question-and-answer chat format is used. At the beginning of each round two LLM chatbots from a diverse pool of nine are presented randomly and anonymously, their identities only being revealed upon voting on their answers. The user has the option of either replaying ("regenerating") a round, or beginning an entirely fresh one with new LLMs. (The user also has the option of choosing which LLMs to do battle.)
