= Z.ai =

Chinese artificial intelligence company

Z.AI Co., Ltd.
- Logo (2025)
- Trade name: Z.ai; Zhipu AI (China)
- Native name: 北京智谱华章科技有限公司
- Type: Public
- Traded as: SEHK: 2513
- Industry: Artificial intelligence
- Founded: 2019; 7 years ago
- Founders: Tang Jie; Li Juanzi
- Headquarters: Beijing, China
- Key people: Zhang Peng (CEO)
- Products: GLM
- Number of employees: 800+ (2024)
- Website: zhipuai.cn; z.ai

Z.AI Co., Ltd., (Note: formerly as Beijing Zhipu Huazhang Technology Co., Ltd. (Chinese: 北京智谱华章科技有限公司) and Knowledge Atlas Technology Joint Stock Co., Ltd.) branded internationally as Z.ai, is a Chinese artificial intelligence company; their flagship product is the GLM (General Language Model) family of open weights large language models (LLMs). Formerly known as Zhipu AI outside China until 2025, it is China's first major LLM company to make initial public offering, on the Hong Kong Stock Exchange in January 2026. With a market capitalization of US$62 billion as of August 2026, it is the most valuable public AI pure play in China.

Founded in Beijing in 2019 by Jie Tang as a Tsinghua University spin-out, researchers introduced the first GLM version in May 2022, preceding the AI boom. Z.ai's models have released under the free and open-source MIT License since July 2025; they have also released vision language models, text-to-video models, and the ZCode AI coding harness.

As of 2024, it is one of China's six "AI tiger" companies by investors and considered to be the third-largest LLM market player in China according to the International Data Corporation. In January 2025, the United States Commerce Department blacklisted the company in its Entity List due to national security concerns. Z.ai owns AMiner, a research database similar to Google Scholar.

== Name ==
The company's full name within China is 北京智谱华章科技有限公司, Běijīng Zhìpǔ Huázhāng Kējì Yǒuxiàn Gōngsī, 'Beijing Zhipu Huazhang Technology Co., Ltd.' The term Zhipu was sometimes translated by Chinese researchers as 'Wisdom Spectrum'. It is listed on the Hong Kong Stock Exchange as Z.AI Co., Ltd., and branded internationally as Z.ai.

== History ==
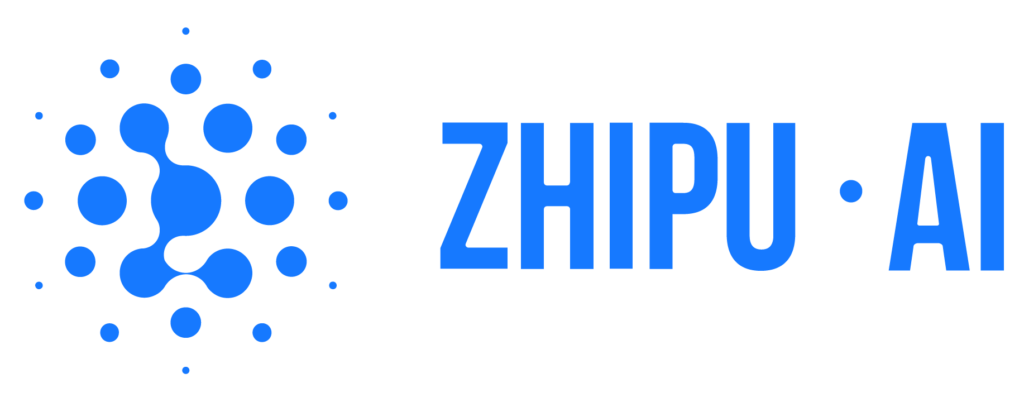
Logo from 2019 to 2025

Founded in 2019, the startup company began from Tsinghua University and was later spun out as an independent company. Researchers published an Association for Computational Linguistics conference paper in May 2022 introducing the GLM (General Language Model) training algorithm, which uses an "autoregressive blank infilling" strategy that creates cloze tests by randomly removing segments of input text and trains the model to autoregressively regenerate the removed text.

In 2023, it raised 2.5 billion yuan (approx. 350 million in USD) from Alibaba Group and Tencent, along with Meituan, Ant Group, Xiaomi, and HongShan. In March 2024, Zhipu AI announced it was developing a Sora-like technology to achieve artificial general intelligence (AGI). In May 2024, the Saudi Arabian finance firm Prosperity7 Ventures, LLC participated in a US$400 million financing round for Zhipu AI with a valuation of approximately US$3 billion. In July 2024, they debuted the Ying text-to-video model.

Zhipu released GLM-4-Plus in August 2024. In October 2024, Zhipu released GLM-4-Voice, an end-to-end speech large language model that can adjust its tone or dialect. Zhipu disclosed in April 2025 that it had started preparing for its initial public offering (IPO) and released two models under the free and open-source MIT License. In May 2025, the company sealed a 61.28 million yuan deal from the Chinese government for city projects in Hangzhou.

In July 2025, Zhipu AI released GLM-4.5 and GLM-4.5 Air, their next generation language models, and the company rebranded itself as Z.ai internationally. In August 2025, Z.ai announced that their GLM models are compatible with Huawei's Ascend processors. On 11 August 2025, Z.ai released a new vision-language model (VLM) with a total of 106B parameters, GLM-4.5V. In late September 2025, the company released GLM-4.6 using China's domestic chips such as those from Cambricon Technologies. Z.ai released GLM-4.6V and GLM-4.7 in December 2025. That same year, the company changed its official name to Knowledge Atlas Technology JSC Ltd.

On 8 January 2026, Z.ai held its IPO on the Hong Kong Stock Exchange to become a listed company. It is considered to be China's first major LLM company that went through an IPO.

On 12 February 2026, Z.ai released GLM-5.

In late February 2026, Z.ai's shares fell by 23% as it experienced a shortage of compute resources, leading to user complaints and Z.ai issuing a public call for support. Z.ai also restricted new user signups.

In late March 2026, Z.ai released the GLM-5.1 model to subscription users. On 7 April 2026, Z.ai released GLM-5.1 as open-source. The same day, Z.ai increased its API prices by 10%, but maintained a lower price than its United States competitor Anthropic's Opus 4.6 model. On release, the company's share price increased 11.5%.

On 16 June 2026, GLM-5.2 was released with a one-million token context window, an increase from GLM-5.1's 200K-token context window.

On 14 August 2026, GLM-5.3 was released. It uses the same 743 billion parameter base model as GLM-5.2, but with improved post-training. In September, CAISI found GLM 5.3 to be the most advanced in cybersecurity among open-weight models. The same month, Anthropic evaluated GLM-5.3's cybersecurity capability at a similar level to its Claude Mythos Preview, which it released to partner organizations in April 2026.

== Products and services ==
Z.AI provides the following products and services:

- GLM (initialism for General Language Model; formerly known as ChatGLM), a series of pre-trained dialogue models initially developed by Zhipu AI and Tsinghua KEG in 2023. GLM-4.5, released in July 2025 by Z.ai, can run on eight NVIDIA H20 chips. The release of GLM-4.6 in late September 2025 marked the first integration of FP8 and Int4 quantization on Cambricon chips. It also supports native FP8 on Moore Threads GPUs.
- Ying, a text-to-video model that generates image and text prompts into a six-second video clip within about 30 seconds.
- AutoGLM, an AI agent application that uses voice commands to complete tasks within a smartphone. The app can analyze complex tasks such as ordering an item from a nearby store and repeating an order based from the user's shopping history.
- AMiner, created by Jie Tang (co-founder of Z.ai) in March 2006, now owned by Z.ai.

Z.AI has offices in the Middle East, United Kingdom, Singapore, and Malaysia, along with innovation center projects across Southeast Asia (2025). In January 2025, the United States Commerce Department added the company to its Entity List, citing national security concerns.

=== ZCode ===
ZCode
- Developer: Z.ai
- Release: 2 July 2026; 4 months ago
- Operating system: Windows, macOS, Linux
- Type: AI coding agent
- License: Apache License
- Website: zcode.z.ai/en
- Repository: https://docs.z.ai/guides/vlm/glm-5.3-flash

ZCode is an AI coding development environment developed by Z.ai. It was released on 2 July 2026, as a desktop application for Windows, macOS, and Linux, and was initially designed around Z.ai's GLM large language models.

ZCode includes an AI coding agent that can read and modify project files, execute terminal commands, work with Git, and use a built-in web browser to test applications. ZCode supports models from OpenAI, Anthropic, Moonshot AI, and models through OpenRouter.

== See also ==
- List of artificial intelligence companies
- List of large language models
- Lists of open-source artificial intelligence software
