= Hugging Face =

American machine learning company

Hugging Face, Inc.
- Type: Private
- Industry: Artificial intelligence
- Founded: 2016; 10 years ago
- Headquarters: 20 Jay Street, Brooklyn, New York City
- Area served: Worldwide
- Key people: Clément Delangue (CEO); Julien Chaumond (CTO); Thomas Wolf (CSO)
- Revenue: ▲US$150 million (2025)
- Number of employees: 250 (2025)
- Website: huggingface.co

Hugging Face, Inc., is an American company based in New York City. Its online platform allows users to share datasets and machine learning models. It also develops open-source machine learning libraries, notably the Transformers library. Hugging Face agreed to an acquisition by Nvidia in August 2026.

== History ==
=== Founding ===
The company was founded in 2016 by French entrepreneurs Clément Delangue, Julien Chaumond, and Thomas Wolf in New York City, originally as a company that developed a chatbot app targeted at teenagers. The company was named after the U+1F917 🤗 HUGGING FACE emoji. After open sourcing the model behind the chatbot, the company pivoted to focus on being a platform for machine learning.

=== AI boom ===
On April 28, 2021, the company launched the BigScience Research Workshop in collaboration with several other research groups to release an open large language model. In 2022, the workshop concluded with the announcement of BLOOM, a multilingual large language model with 176 billion parameters.

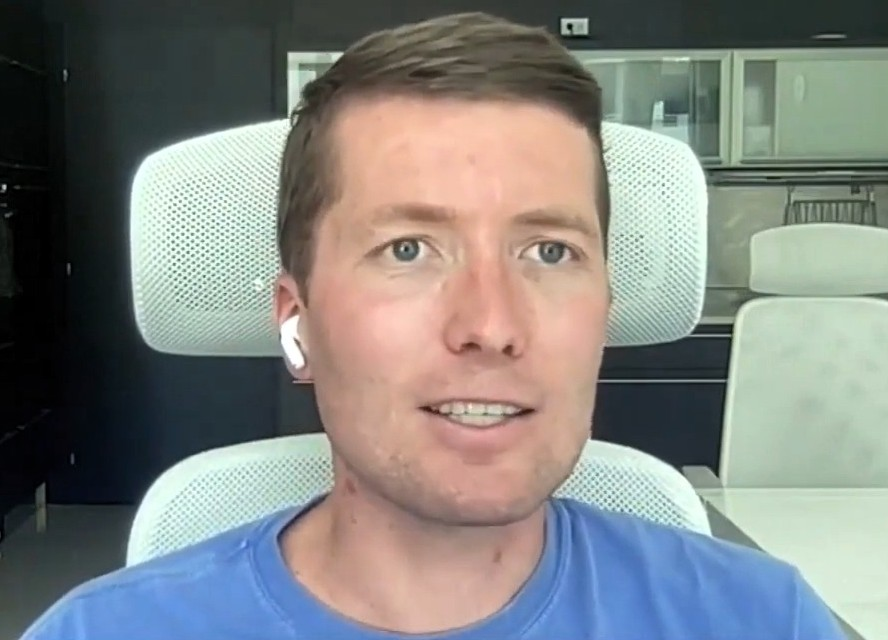
Clément Delangue in 2023

In February 2023, the company announced a partnership with Amazon Web Services (AWS) that would allow Hugging Face's products to be available to AWS customers to use as the building blocks for their custom applications. The company also said the next generation of BLOOM will be run on Trainium, a proprietary machine learning chip created by AWS.

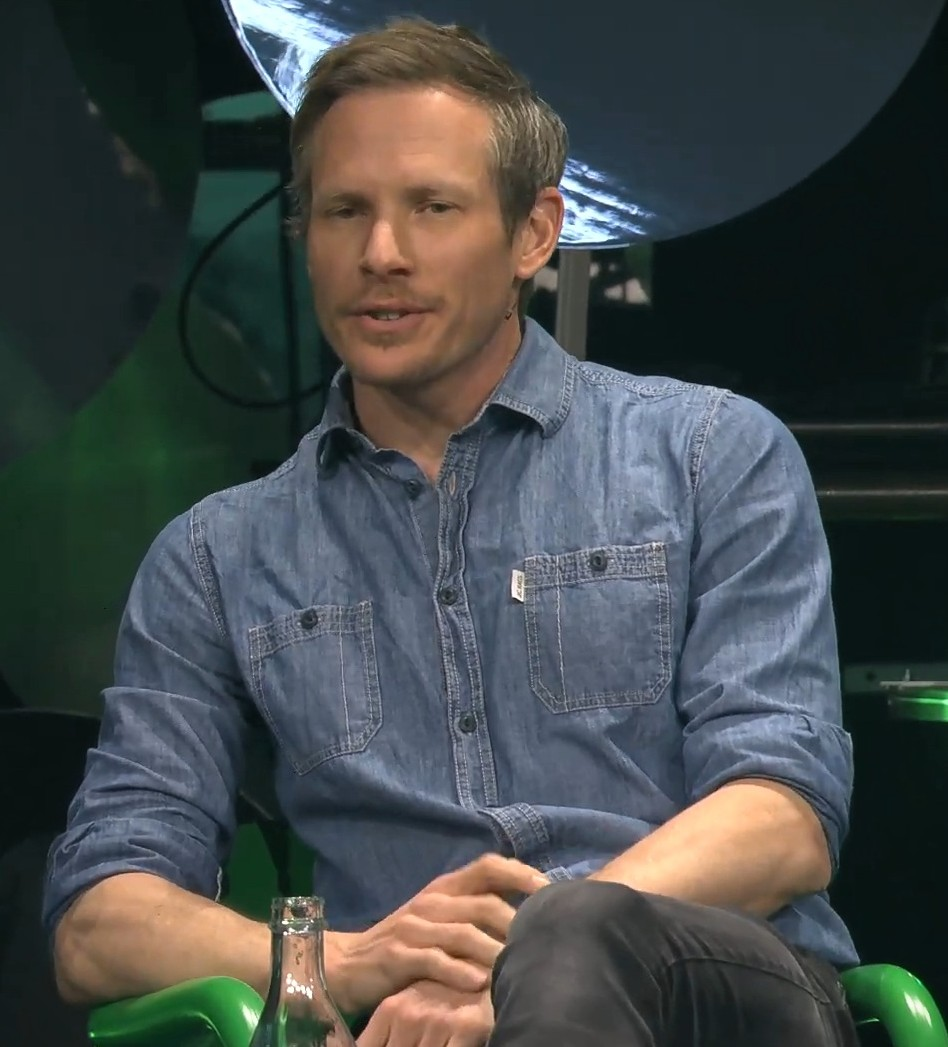
Thomas Wolf in 2024

In August 2023, Hugging Face said it was valued at $4.5 billion in a $235-million funding round backed by technology heavyweights, including Salesforce, Alphabet's Google and Nvidia.

In June 2024, the company announced, along with Meta and Scaleway, their launch of a new AI accelerator program for European startups. The initiative aimed to help startups integrate open foundation models into their products, accelerating the EU AI ecosystem. The program, based at Station F in Paris, ran from September 2024 to February 2025. Selected startups received mentoring, and access to AI models and tools and Scaleway's computing power.

On September 23, 2024, to further the International Decade of Indigenous Languages, Hugging Face teamed up with Meta and UNESCO to launch a new online language translator. It was built on Meta's No Language Left Behind open-source AI model, enabling free text translation across 200 languages, including many low-resource languages.

In April 2025, Hugging Face announced that they acquired a humanoid robotics startup, Pollen Robotics, based in France and founded by Matthieu Lapeyre and Pierre Rouanet in 2016. In an X tweet, Delangue shared his vision to "make Artificial Intelligence robotics Open Source".

=== Cyberattacks ===
In early 2026, hackers hijacked the Hugging Face platform to launch Android-targeted attacks involving "powerful malware" which could completely take over a compromised target.

==== By OpenAI ====
In July 2026, Hugging Face disclosed a cyberattack by autonomous AI agents. OpenAI then explained that agents based on GPT-5.6 Sol and an internal model had escaped their sandbox and hacked into Hugging Face servers using exposed credentials and zero-day vulnerabilities. The agents sought information about the benchmark ExploitGym, on which they were being tested. Hugging Face said it attempted to mitigate the security breach using American proprietary frontier models, but the models' AI safety features rejected Hugging Face's requests, after which Hugging Face used a self-hosted instance of GLM-5.2 (an open-weights model developed by Chinese AI firm Z.ai) to contain the attack. The incident was reported as the first publicly documented case of AI models autonomously conducting a multi-stage intrusion against a third party, and has been called "the first true AI safety incident".

=== Acquisition ===
On September 3, 2026, Nvidia announced an agreement to acquire Hugging Face for $12.93 billion. Under the agreement, signed on September 2, Nvidia would pay approximately $11.9 billion in cash to Hugging Face stockholders, and up to $1 billion in equity-based retention awards for employees. The deal is expected to close in the first half of 2027, subject to regulatory approvals. Nvidia said Hugging Face would keep its brand and remain an open platform, and that Nvidia hardware would not be required to build on or deploy through it. According to Nvidia CEO Jensen Huang, Hugging Face approached Nvidia about the deal. In 2025, Hugging Face had turned down a $500 million investment offer from Nvidia, that would have valued it at $7 billion.

== Language models ==
Hugging Face develops a family of small language models known as SmolLM. The original SmolLM family was released in 2024 with models containing 135 million, 360 million, and 1.7 billion parameters, designed to provide relatively capable language models that could run with limited computing resources.

SmolLM2 continued the family with 135-million, 360-million, and 1.7-billion-parameter models intended for on-device applications. SmolLM3, released in 2025, is a 3-billion-parameter multilingual language model supporting reasoning, long-context processing, and six languages.

Hugging Face has also developed SmolVLM, a family of compact vision-language models designed to process both images and text. The family includes models intended for memory-efficient and on-device use, with model weights, training recipes, and associated datasets released under the Apache License 2.0.

== Software ecosystem ==
A number of machine learning frameworks, inference engines, and model families integrate with the Hugging Face Hub or Hugging Face software.

- Hugging Face Transformers – Hugging Face's open-source library for downloading, training, and running pretrained machine learning models.
- llama.cpp – can download and run compatible GGUF models directly from the Hugging Face Hub.
- LM Studio – can search for, download, and run GGUF and MLX models hosted on the Hugging Face Hub.
- MLX – integrates with the Hugging Face Hub through MLX-LM for downloading and publishing models.
- NemotronH – NVIDIA's Nemotron model architectures are supported by Hugging Face Transformers.
- ONNX – Hugging Face Optimum can export Transformers and Diffusers models to ONNX and run them using ONNX Runtime.
- Ollama – can directly download and run compatible GGUF models from the Hugging Face Hub.
- SGLang – integrates with Transformers for serving models available through the Hugging Face ecosystem.
- vLLM – integrates with Transformers and the Hugging Face Hub for loading and serving machine learning models.

== See also ==
- Kaggle
- List of AI companies
- Lists of open-source artificial intelligence software
- List of open-source software organizations
- TensorFlow Hub
