= Foundation model =

Artificial intelligence model paradigm

In artificial intelligence, a foundation model (FM), also known as large x model (LxM, where "x" is a variable representing any text, image, sound, etc.), is a machine learning or deep learning model trained on vast datasets so that it can be applied across a wide range of use cases. Generative AI applications like large language models (LLMs) are common examples of foundation models.

Building foundation models is often highly resource-intensive, with the most advanced models costing hundreds of millions of dollars to cover the expenses of acquiring, curating, and processing massive datasets, as well as the computational power required for training. These costs stem from the need for sophisticated infrastructure, extended training times, and advanced hardware, such as graphics processing units. In contrast, adapting an existing foundation model for a specific task or using it directly is far less costly, as it uses pre-trained capabilities and typically requires only fine-tuning on smaller, task-specific datasets.

Early examples of foundation models are language models like OpenAI's GPT series. In addition to text, foundation models have been developed for visual images, including DALL-E and Stable Diffusion.

== Definitions ==
The Stanford Institute for Human-Centered Artificial Intelligence's (HAI) Center for Research on Foundation Models (CRFM) coined the term "foundation model" in August 2021 to mean "any model that is trained on broad data (generally using self-supervision at scale) that can be adapted (e.g., fine-tuned) to a wide range of downstream tasks". This was based on their observation that preexisting terms — while overlapping, and not wrong — were not adequate, stating that "large language model", for instance, was too narrow given its applicative focus is not only language. The term "self-supervised model" was too specific to the training objective; and 'pretrained model' suggested that the noteworthy action all happened after 'pretraining." The term "foundation model" was chosen over "foundational model" because "foundational" implies that these models provide fundamental principles in a way that "foundation" does not. The term vision-language model (VLM) is also used as a near-synonym.

As governments regulate foundation models, new legal definitions have emerged.

- In the United States, the now revoked Executive Order on the Safe, Secure, and Trustworthy Development and Use of Artificial Intelligence defined a foundation model as "an AI model that is trained on broad data; generally uses self-supervision; contains at least tens of billions of parameters; is applicable across a wide range of contexts".
- In the United States, the proposed AI Foundation Model Transparency Act of 2023 by House Representatives Don Beyer (D–VA) and Anna Eshoo (D, CA) defines a foundation model as "an artificial intelligence model trained on broad data, generally uses self supervision, generally contains at least 1,000,000,000 parameters, is applicable across a wide range of contexts, and exhibits, or could be easily modified to exhibit, high levels of performance at tasks that could pose a serious risk to security, national economic security, national public health or safety, or any combination of those matters."
- In the European Union, the European Parliament's negotiated position on the E.U. AI Act defines a foundation model as an "AI model that is trained on broad data at scale, is designed for generality of output, and can be adapted to a wide range of distinctive tasks".
- In the United Kingdom, the Competition and Markets Authority's AI Foundation Models: Initial Report defines foundation models as "a type of AI technology that are trained on vast amounts of data that can be adapted to a wide range of tasks and operations."

The United States's definitions are the only ones to make reference to the size of a foundation model, and differ on magnitude. Beyer and Eshoo's definition also specifies that foundation models must achieve a level of performance as to be a potential danger. In contrast, the E.U. definition requires the model to be designed for generality of output. All definitions agree that foundation models must be trained on a broad range of data with potential applications in many domains.

== History ==
Technologically, foundation models are built using established machine learning techniques like deep neural networks, transfer learning, and self-supervised learning. Foundation models differ from previous techniques as they are general purpose models that function as a reusable infrastructure, instead of bespoke and one-off task-specific models.

Advances in computer parallelism (e.g., CUDA GPUs) and new developments in neural network architecture (e.g., Transformers), and the increased use of training data with minimal supervision all contributed to the rise of foundation models. Foundation models began to materialize as the latest wave of deep learning models in the late 2010s. Relative to most prior work on deep learning, these language models demonstrated the potential of training on much larger web-sourced datasets using self-supervised objectives (e.g. predicting the next word in a large corpus of text). These approaches, which draw upon earlier works like word2vec and GloVe, deviated from prior supervised approaches that required annotated data (e.g. crowd-sourced labels).

The 2022 releases of Stable Diffusion and ChatGPT (initially powered by the GPT-3.5 model) led to foundation models and generative AI entering widespread public discourse. Further, releases of LLaMA, Llama 2, and Mistral in 2023 contributed to a greater emphasis placed on how foundation models are released with open foundation models garnering a lot of support and scrutiny.

== Related concepts ==
=== Frontier models ===
Certain highly advanced foundation models are termed "frontier models", whether because they expand the frontier (state of the art) or because they are considered above a certain threshold of risk.

There is no single standard for assessing risks from frontier models. Some examples of dangerous capabilities include:

- Designing and synthesizing new biological or chemical weapons
- Enabling novel offensive cyber attacks
- Evading human control through deceptive means

It may be difficult to regulate the development and deployment of frontier models, due to limited interpretability, unforeseen capability improvements, ease of misuse, and rapid proliferation. If a frontier model is open-weight and publicly available online, the model can spread more rapidly, while the combination of greater customizability and non-revocable access exacerbates problems of accountability and regulatory oversight.

Mitigating all harms that might arise from already-deployed frontier models becomes more difficult due to post-release modifications and attacks such as API fine-tuning and prompt injection, as well as capabilities enhancements such as the agent harness, access to external resources (data, tools, systems), and orchestration among AI systems.

The industry-led Frontier Model Forum was founded in July 2023 by OpenAI, Anthropic, Google DeepMind, and Microsoft, with a stated goal of supporting safety research, best-practice standards, and information-sharing about advanced foundation models. A network of national Artificial intelligence safety institutes (AISIs) have formed to assess risk from frontier models.

=== General-purpose AI ===
Foundation models adaptable to a wide range of use-cases are sometimes referred to as general-purpose AI. In designing the EU AI Act, the European Parliament has stated that a new wave of general-purpose AI technologies shapes the overall AI ecosystem.

=== World models ===
World models are sometimes described as foundation models. World models are a representation of an environment intended to predict the state of that environment after taking a set of actions, as well as to implicitly model physical concepts such as gravity. Input prompts for world models can include text or images, as well as videos or 3D scenes, and the resulting 3D environments can be exported. World models, alongside embodied AI, multi-agent models, and neuroscience models of the brain, are seen as alternatives to large language models for achieving general artificial intelligence.

World models do not have a fully agreed definition, but have been divided into two scopes: one for representing and understanding the current environment, and another for predicting the future state of that environment. In the former view, world models are developed using model-based reinforcement learning and a Markov decision process, using model predictive control or Monte Carlo tree search to create policies. With the latter, (multimodal) large language models or video generation models can be used. In addition, these environments can be immersive simulations for training AI agents that can interact in the real world.

==== History ====
Quanta Magazine traced world models back to a 1943 publication by Kenneth Craik on mental models and the blocks world of SHRDLU in the 1960s. Business Insider traced world models to a 1971 paper by Jay Wright Forrester. A related idea of organizing world knowledge, the frame representation, was proposed by Marvin Minsky in 1974.

In 2018, researchers David Ha and Jürgen Schmidhuber defined world models in the context of reinforcement learning: an agent with a variational autoencoder model V for representing visual observations, a recurrent neural network model M for representing memory, and a linear model C for making decisions. They suggested that agents trained on world models in environments that simulate reality could be applied to real world settings.

In 2022, Yann LeCun saw a world model (defined by him as a neural network that acts as a mental model for aspects of the world that are seen as relevant) as part of a larger system of cognitive architecture – other neural networks that are analogous to different regions of the brain. In his view, this framework could lead to commonsense reasoning. LeCun has estimated that world models would be fully functional by the late 2020s to mid 2030s.

==== Training ====
World models are trained on a variety of data modalities, including text, images, audio and video, and have been applied to video generation. One open source dataset for world models includes 1 billion data points across multiple modalities (text, images, audio, video and point clouds), including 1 million manual annotations.

==== Examples ====
TechCrunch saw Sora as an example of a world model, while in January 2025, Nvidia released its own set of world models. The South China Morning Post wrote that Manycore Tech was another example of companies aiming to build a world model, viewing their work as an example of spatial intelligence. In May 2025, Mohamed bin Zayed University of Artificial Intelligence released a world model for building simulations to test AI agents.

Google DeepMind has also released two world models in two-dimensional space and three-dimensional space, respectively, that were trained on video data, with Google claiming that the latter can be a training environment for AI agents. Meta released a world model in June 2025, Tencent released an open source world model in July 2025. Niantic, Inc. spinoff, Niantic Spatial, is developing a world model using anonymized player scans from Pokémon GO. Other companies that are planning as of 2025 to build world models include ByteDance and xAI.

==== Applications ====
Computer scientist researcher Fei-Fei Li views world models as applying to robotics and creative works. Due to the complexity of these models, she advocates for more complex strategies in data acquisition, data engineering, data processing, and synthesizing data. She co-founded a startup on building world models, which, as of 2024, planned to do so in three phases: incorporating an understanding of three-dimensional space along with time; support for augmented reality; and support for robotics. Her startup, World Labs, released its commercial world model, Marble, in November 2025.

World models are intended for use in interactive media (such as video games and movies) and environment simulation. Proposed use cases for world models include action planning and outcome prediction. Other applications include social simulacra to simulate social systems. Wired compared world models to the metaverse, while Business Insider noted possible military applications.

In 2025, world models are being applied to drone warfare, robotics, and self-driving vehicles. The Wall Street Journal speculated that world models could improve spatial reasoning of artificial intelligence models and successfully automate both blue-collar and white-collar jobs. As of October 2025, research has shown mixed results in the spatial reasoning capabilities of text-to-video models (in particular, Veo 3). In Ophthalmology, foundation models have been applied to retinal imaging including volumetric optical coherence tomography

==== Concerns ====
TechCrunch noted that world models could use more data than large language models and would require significantly more computational power (including the use of thousands of GPUs for training and inference). It also noted the risk of hallucinations, coverage bias and algorithmic bias. Similarly, The Financial Times noted the difficulty and expense in collecting data to simulate the world and training models to use that data.

Creative professionals have expressed concern that world models could disrupt jobs in their industries.

Other concerns include data privacy, simulation of harmful situations, misinformation and disinformation, emergent behaviors, and copyright.

== Technical details ==
=== Model architecture ===
For a foundation model to effectively generalize, it must acquire rich representations of the training data. As a result, expressive model architectures that efficiently process large-scale data are often preferred in building foundation models. Currently, the Transformer architecture is the de facto choice for building foundation models across a range of modalities.

=== Training ===
Foundation models are built by optimizing a loss function, which is a mathematical function that determines how model parameters are updated based on model predictions on training data. Language models are often trained with a next-tokens prediction objective, which refers to the extent at which the model is able to predict the next token in a sequence. Image models are commonly trained with contrastive learning or diffusion training objectives. For contrastive learning, images are randomly augmented before being evaluated on the resulting similarity of the model's representations. For diffusion models, images are noised and the model learns to gradually de-noise via the objective. Multimodal training objectives also exist, with some separating images and text during training, while others examine them concurrently. In general, the training objectives for foundation models promote the learning of broadly useful representations of data.

With the rise of foundation models and the larger datasets that power them, a training objective must be able to parse through internet-scale data for meaningful data points. Additionally, since foundation models are designed to solve a general range of tasks, training objectives ought to be domain complete, or able to solve a broad set of downstream capabilities within the given domain. Lastly, foundation model training objectives should seek to scale well and be computationally efficient. With model size and compute power both being relevant constraints, a training objective must be able to overcome such bottlenecks.

=== Data ===
Foundation models are trained on a large quantity of data, working under the maxim "the more data, the better." Performance evaluation does show that more data generally leads to better performance, but other issues arise as data quantity grows. Tasks like managing the dataset, integrating data across new applications, ensuring adherence to data licenses, and maintaining data quality all become more difficult as data size grows. The specific demands of foundation models have only exacerbated such issues, as it remains the norm for large foundation models to use public web-scraped data. Foundation models include also search engines data and SEO meta tags data. Public web data remains a plentiful resource, but it also demands stringent moderation and data processing from foundation model developers before it can be successfully integrated into the training pipeline.

Training foundation models often runs the risk of violating user privacy, as private data can be disclosed, collected, or used in ways beyond the stated scope. Even if no private data is leaked, models can still inadvertently compromise security through learned behavior in the resulting foundation model. Data quality is another key point, as web-scraped data frequently contains biased, duplicate, and toxic material. Once foundation models are deployed, ensuring high-quality data is still an issue, as undesirable behavior can still emerge from small subsets of data.

=== Systems ===
The size of foundation models also brings about issues with the computer systems they run on. The average foundation model is too large to be run within a single accelerator's memory and the initial training process requires an expensive amount of resources. Such issues are predicted to further exacerbate in future as foundation models grow to new heights. Due to this constraint, researchers have begun looking into compressing model size through tight model inference.

GPUs are the most common choice of compute hardware for machine learning, due to high memory storage and strong power. Typical foundation model training requires many GPUs in a distributed computing setup, connected in parallel with fast interconnects. Acquiring a sufficient amount of GPUs of requisite compute efficiency is a challenge for many foundation model developers, one that has led to an increasing dilemma in the field. Larger models require greater compute power, but often at the cost of improved compute efficiency. Since training remains time-consuming and expensive, the tradeoff between compute power and compute efficiency has led only a few select companies to afford the production costs for large, state of the art foundation models. Some techniques like compression and distillation can make inference more affordable, but they fail to completely shore up this weakness.

=== Scaling ===
The accuracy and capabilities of foundation models often scale predictably with the size of the model and the amount of the training data. Specifically, scaling laws have been discovered, which are data-based empirical trends that relate resources (data, model size, compute usage) to model capabilities. Particularly, a model's scale is defined by compute, dataset size, and the number of parameters, all of which exhibit a power-law relationship with end performance.

However, broken scaling laws have been discovered in which this relationship smoothly transitions (at points referred to as break(s)) from a power law with one exponent to a power law with another (different) exponent. When one does not collect any points near (or after) the break(s), it can be difficult to obtain an accurate extrapolation.

=== Adaptation ===
Foundation models are inherently multi-purpose: to use these models for a specific use case requires some form of adaptation. At a minimum, models need to be adapted to perform the task of interest (task specification), but often better performance can be achieved by more extensive adaptation to the domain of interest (domain specialization).

A variety of methods (e.g. prompting, in-context learning, fine-tuning, LoRA) provide different tradeoffs between the costs of adaptation and the extent to which models are specialized. Some major facets to consider when adapting a foundation model are compute budget and data availability. Foundation models can be very large, up to trillions of parameters in size, so adapting the entirety of a foundation model can be computationally expensive. Therefore, developers sometimes adapt only the last neural layer or only the bias vectors to save time and space. For particularly niche applications, specific data may also not be available to adapt the foundation model sufficiently. In such circumstances, data must be manually labeled, which is costly and can demand expert knowledge.

=== Evaluation ===
Evaluation is a key part of developing foundation models. Not only does evaluation allow for tracking progress of high-performance models, it also creates benchmarks for future model development. Stakeholders rely on evaluations to understand model behaviors and gain insight into their various attributes. Traditionally, foundation models are evaluated relative to each other through standardized task benchmarks like MMLU, MMMU, HumanEval, and GSM8K. Given that foundation models are multi-purpose, increasingly meta-benchmarks are developed that aggregate different underlying benchmarks. Examples include LM-Harness, BIG-Bench, HELM, OpenLLM Leaderboard, DecodingTrust, and HEIM.

Since foundation models' utility depends on their own general capabilities and the performance of fine-tuned applications, evaluation must cover both metrics. Proper evaluation examines both a foundation model's downstream applications in aggregate and the direct properties the foundation model holds. To ensure further equity in evaluation, certain existing evaluation frameworks account for all adaptation resources, which leads to more informed analyses for the benefit of all stakeholders.

== Supply chain ==
Foundation models' general capabilities allow them to fulfill a unique role in the AI ecosystem, fueled by many upstream and downstream technologies. Training a foundation model requires several resources (e.g. data, compute, labor, hardware, code), with foundation models often involving immense amounts of data and compute (also referred to as computational power). Due to foundation models' large development costs and inexpensive adaptation requirements, the AI landscape has shifted to a small subset of AI companies making foundation models for downstream adaptation. Thus, most foundation model companies outsource this step to specialized data providers (e.g. Scale AI, Surge) and compute providers (e.g. Amazon Bedrock, Google Cloud, Microsoft Azure).

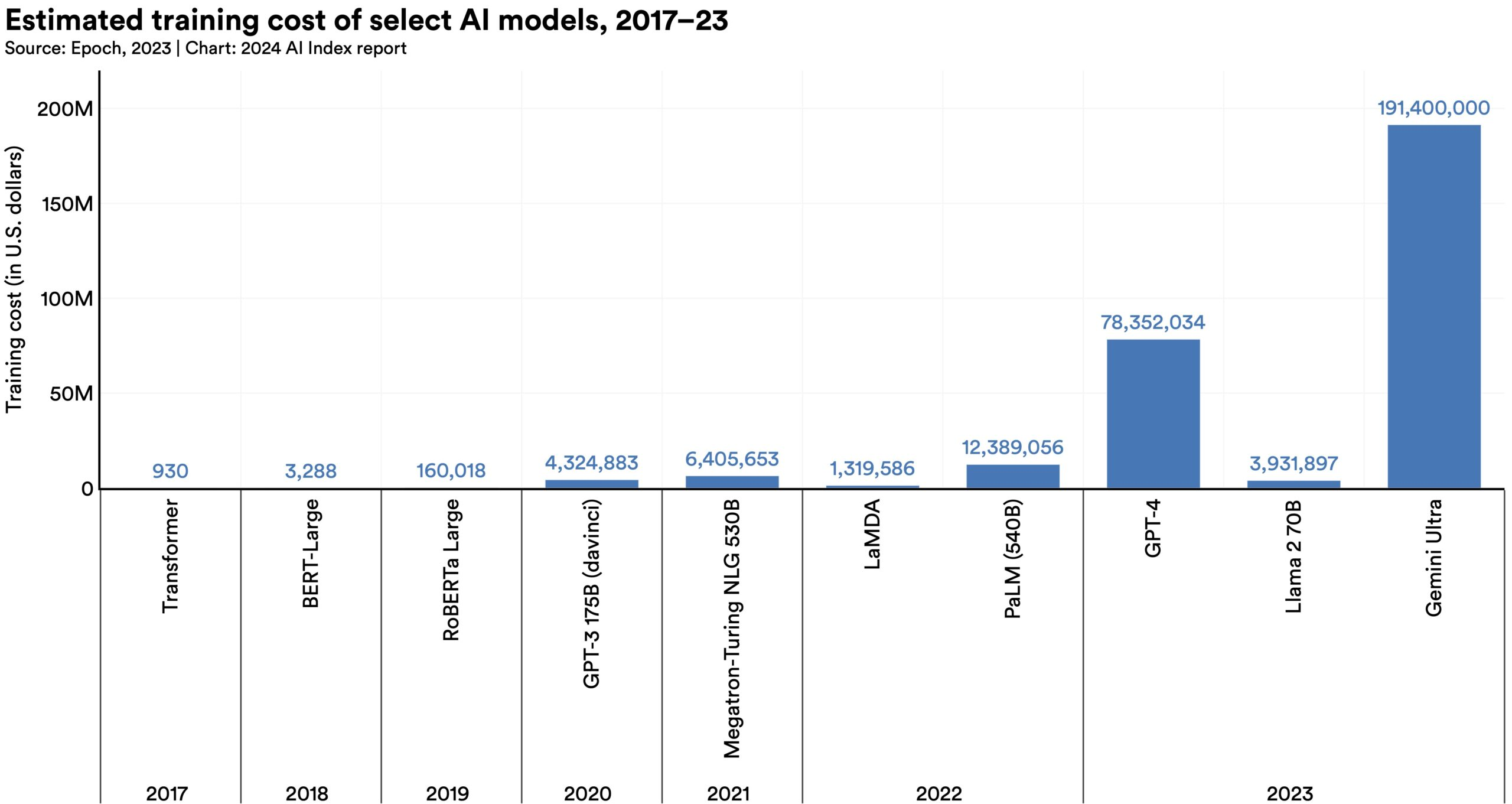
Investment in computing capabilities to train larger AI models has rapidly increased.

The foundation model developer itself will then take the data and use the supplied compute to actually train the foundation model. After the foundation model is completely built, much of the data and labor requirements abate. In this development process, hardware and compute are the most necessary, and also the most exclusive resources. To train larger and more complex AI, a sufficient amount of compute is key. However, compute is consolidated in the hands of a few, select entities, which most foundation model developers depend on. As such, the foundation model pipeline is concentrated heavily around these providers. Compute is also costly; in 2023, AI companies spent more than 80% of total capital on compute resources.

Foundation models require a large amount of general data to power their capabilities. Early foundation models scraped from subsets of the internet to provide this data information. As the size and scope of foundation models grows, larger quantities of internet scraping becomes necessary, resulting in higher likelihoods of biased or toxic data. This toxic or biased data can disproportionately harm marginalized groups and exacerbate existing prejudices.

To address this issue of low-quality data that arose with unsupervised training, some foundation model developers have turned to manual filtering. This practice, known as data labor, comes with its own host of issues. Such manual data detoxification is often outsourced to reduce labor costs, with some workers making less than $2 per hour.

The foundation model will then be hosted online either via the developer or via an external organization. Once released, other parties can create applications based on the foundation model, whether through fine-tuning or wholly new purposes. People can then access these applications to serve their various means, allowing one foundation model to power and reach a wide audience.

== Release strategies ==
After a foundation model is built, it can be released in one of many ways. There are many facets to a release: the asset itself, who has access, how access changes over time, and the conditions on use. All these factors contribute to how a foundation model will affect downstream applications. In particular, the two most common forms of foundation model release are through APIs and direct model downloads.

When a model is released via an API, users can query the model and receive responses, but cannot directly access the model itself. Comparatively, the model could be directly downloadable for users to access and modify. Both release strategies are often classified as an open release. The exact definition of an open release is disputed, but widely accepted requirements are provided by the Open Source Initiative.

Some open foundation models are: PaLM 2, Llama 2, Granite, and Mistral. While open foundation models can further research and development more easily, they are also more susceptible to misuse. Open foundation models can be downloaded by anyone, and particularly powerful models can be fine-tuned to intentionally or unintentionally cause harm.

During a closed release, the foundation model cannot be accessed by the public, but is used internally by an organization. Such releases are considered safer, but offer no additional value to the research community or the public at large.

Some foundation models like Google DeepMind's Flamingo are fully closed, meaning they are available only to the model developer; others, such as OpenAI's GPT-4, are limited access, available to the public but only as a black box; and still others, such as Meta's Llama 2 are open, with broadly available model weights enabling downstream modification and scrutiny.
