= GPT-5.3 =

2026 large language models by OpenAI

- Developer: OpenAI
- Release: February 5, 2026; 9 months ago (Codex); March 3, 2026; 8 months ago (Instant)
- Predecessor: GPT-5.2
- Successor: GPT-5.4 (Codex); GPT-5.5 (Instant)
- Type: Multimodal; Large language model; Generative pre-trained transformer; Foundation model
- License: Proprietary
- Website: GPT-5.3-Codex; GPT-5.3 Instant

GPT-5.3 (Generative Pre-trained Transformer 5.3) is a family of large language models (LLMs) developed by OpenAI and released in 2026.

OpenAI did not release a main Thinking or Pro model in the GPT-5.3 series, with those skipping straight from GPT-5.2 to GPT-5.4. The GPT-5.3 series only consists of two specific models: GPT-5.3-Codex and GPT-5.3 Instant.

== GPT-5.3-Codex ==
GPT-5.3-Codex is a large language model (LLM) announced and released by OpenAI on February 5, 2026.

It is made as a competitor to Claude's Opus 4.6, focusing on code generation, speed and the ability to search repositories, run terminal commands and at the same time, debug code.

GPT-5.3 Codex is available in the Codex app and on the web; access via API is also planned.

According to OpenAI, GPT-5.3-Codex is the company's "first model that was instrumental in creating itself."

On February 12, 2026, GPT-5.3-Codex-Spark was released in a research preview, which is a smaller version of GPT-5.3-Codex which supports text-only input. As of February 2026, GPT-5.3-Codex-Spark is only available for ChatGPT Pro ($200/month) subscribers.

== GPT-5.3 Instant ==
GPT-5.3 Instant is a large language model (LLM) announced and released on March 3, 2026, becoming the default model in ChatGPT. It was made available to all ChatGPT users and was the fastest ChatGPT model available at the time. According to OpenAI, the model delivers more accurate answers and reduces hallucinations by 26.8% when using the web.

It was succeeded by GPT-5.5 Instant on May 5, 2026.
