= Thibault Sottiaux =

OpenAI product executive

- Other name: Tibo Sottiaux
- Citizenship: Belgium
- Occupations: Software engineer; Product executive
- Employer: OpenAI
- Known for: Codex

Thibault "Tibo" Sottiaux is a Belgian software engineer and product executive at OpenAI, where he leads the company's core product and platform organization. He previously led Codex, OpenAI's AI coding agent.

== Career ==
Before joining OpenAI, Sottiaux spent several years at Google, working on Google Maps and later on machine learning infrastructure for research at Google DeepMind. He joined OpenAI in 2024 and became an engineering lead for Codex, the agentic coding system the company released in 2025.

In May 2026, OpenAI consolidated its product organization under president Greg Brockman, merging the ChatGPT, Codex and API teams into a single core product group. Sottiaux was given responsibility for that group, covering the API, agent infrastructure, enterprise products, ChatGPT and Codex. Wired described the role as making him responsible for turning ChatGPT into a personalized agent intended to serve general users rather than engineers. Fortune covered his position on the resulting "super app" and its role in the company's positioning ahead of a possible public offering.

Among Codex users, Sottiaux became known for announcing resets of subscription usage quotas.
