= Grokipedia =

Online encyclopedia operated by xAI

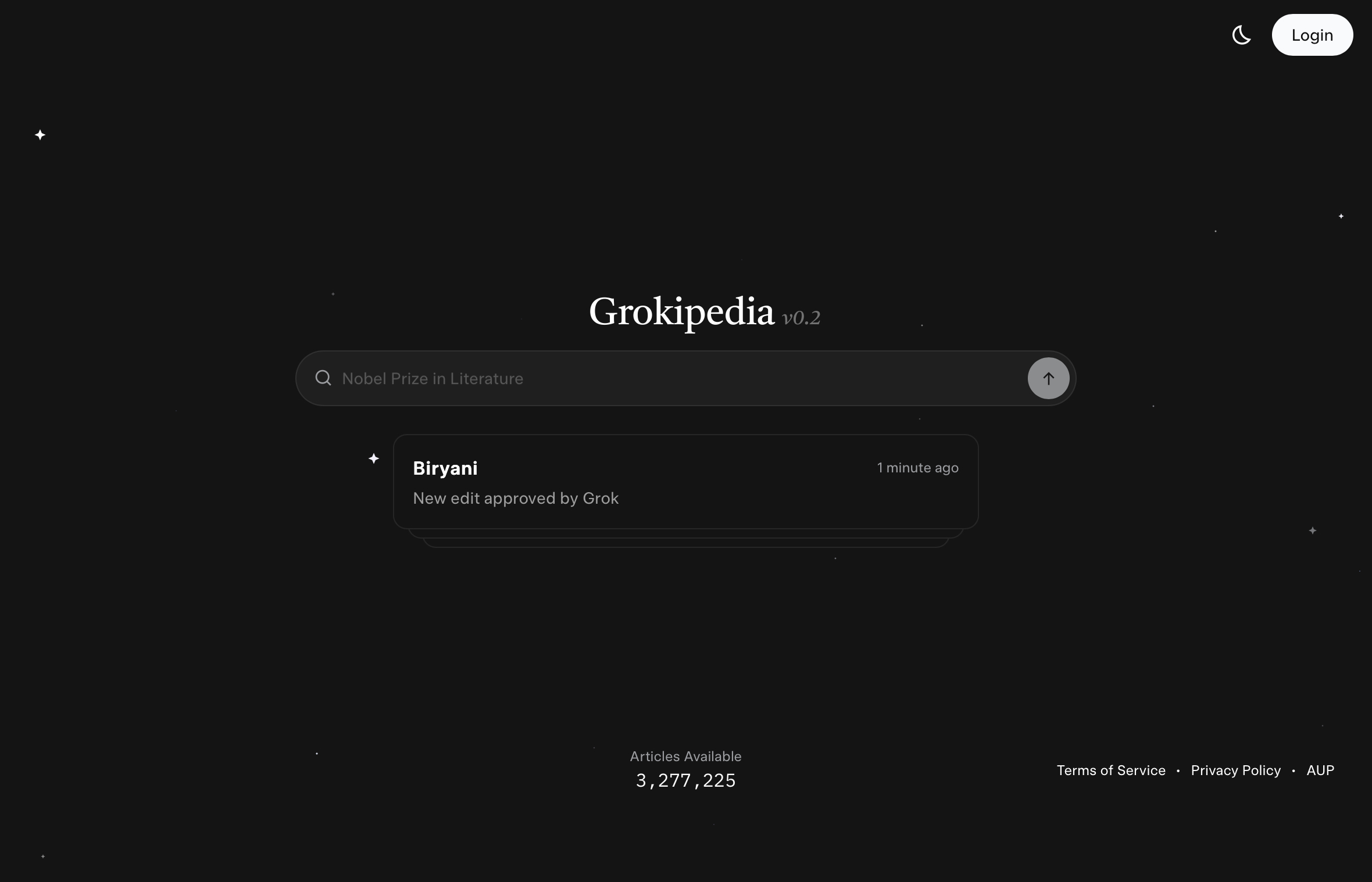
- Screenshot Home page, January 2026
- Website type: AI-generated online encyclopedia
- Available in: English
- Country of origin: United States
- Area served: Worldwide
- Owner: SpaceXAI
- Website: grokipedia.com
- Commercial: Yes
- Registration: Optional (required to suggest edits and new articles)
- Launched: October 27, 2025 (12 months ago)
- Current status: Online
- Content license: X Community License for most articles, Creative Commons BY-SA 4.0 for Wikipedia-derived or copied articles

Grokipedia is an AI-generated online encyclopedia operated by the American company SpaceXAI, founded by Elon Musk. The site was launched on October 27, 2025. Some entries are generated by Grok, a large language model owned by the same company (SpaceXAI), while others were forked from Wikipedia, with some altered and some used nearly verbatim. Articles cannot be directly edited, though logged-in visitors to the encyclopedia can suggest new articles or corrections via a pop-up form, which are reviewed and approved or declined by Grok, and Grok makes autonomous changes to articles.

At launch, Musk suggested Grokipedia would strip the "woke" content out of Wikipedia and act as an alternative to that site. Musk has previously described Wikipedia as an "extension of legacy media propaganda".

External analysis of Grokipedia's content has focused on its accuracy and biases due to hallucinations and potential algorithmic bias, which reviewers have described as promoting right-wing perspectives and Musk's views. The majority of coverage has described the website as validating, promoting, and legitimizing a variety of debunked conspiracy theories and ideas against scientific consensus on topics such as HIV/AIDS denialism, vaccines and autism, climate change, and race and intelligence. The site has been accused of whitewashing far-right extremism, such as by falsely claiming a white genocide is actively occurring. Several right-wing figures have welcomed the site. Studies have highlighted its use of sources deemed as having very low credibility such as Instagram reels and neo-Nazi forums, and for writing about far-right figures and topics in a promotional manner.

In March–April 2026, user-initiated edit updates stopped being processed and Grok itself stopped making autonomous changes, leaving the contents of the website effectively frozen. Updates to Grokipedia resumed in September 2026.

== Background ==
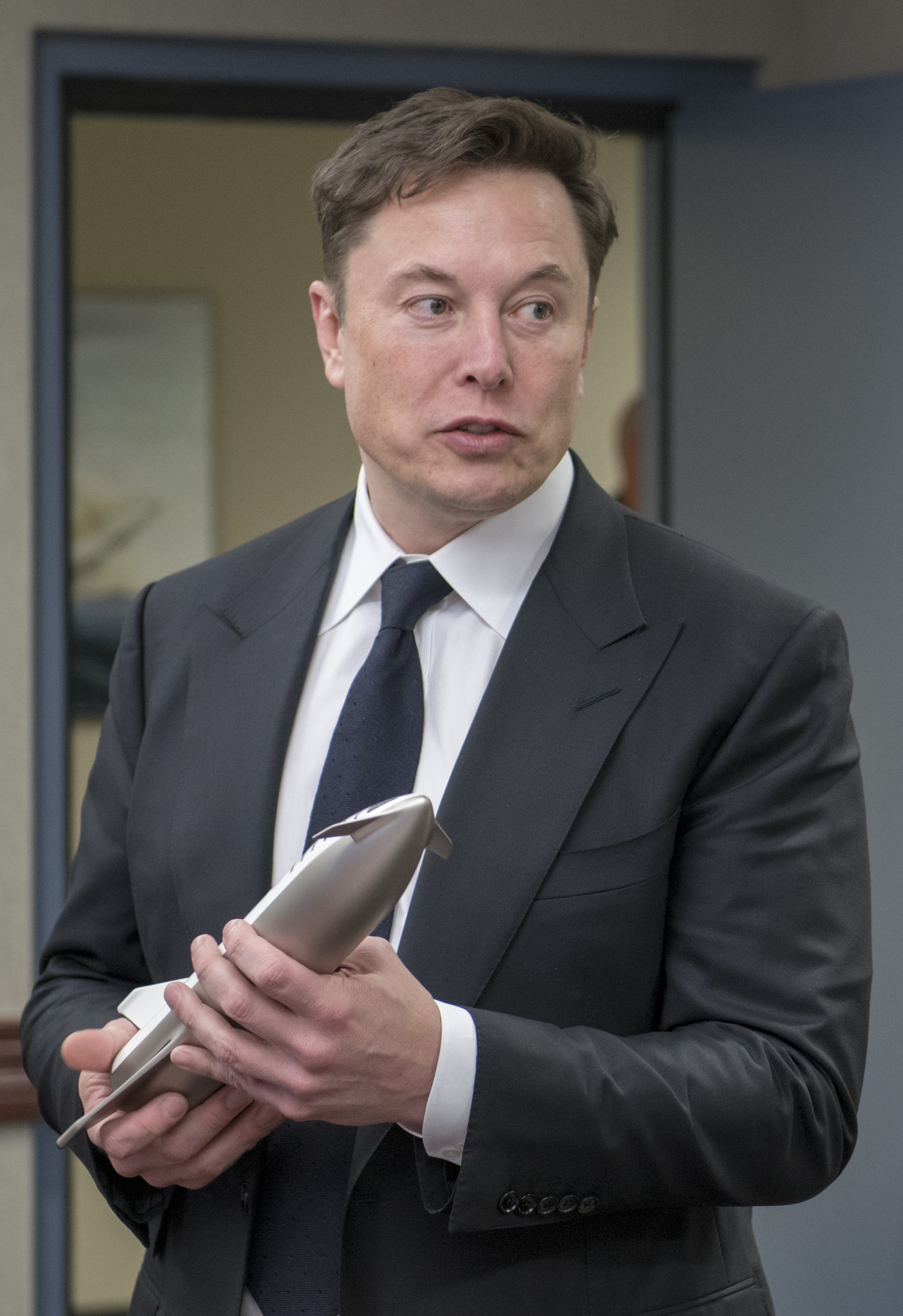
Grokipedia founder Elon Musk in 2019

Wikipedia is an online encyclopedia written and maintained by a community of volunteers. Its possible bias has been studied and debated. In 2018, Haaretz noted "Wikipedia has succeeded in being accused of being both too liberal and too conservative, and has critics from across the spectrum". xAI is an American AI company founded by Elon Musk in 2023. Its flagship product is the family of large language models called Grok.

== History ==
In 2021, Musk expressed an affection for Wikipedia on its 20th anniversary. In 2022, however, Musk argued that Wikipedia was "losing its objectivity", and in 2023, said he would donate US$1 billion to the project if it was pejoratively renamed "Dickipedia". In December 2024, Musk called for a boycott of donations to Wikipedia over its perceived left-wing bias, calling it "Wokepedia". In January 2025, Musk made a series of statements on X denouncing Wikipedia for its description of the incident where he made a controversial gesture, which many viewed as resembling a Nazi salute, at president Donald Trump's second inauguration. Musk has since positioned Grokipedia as an alternative to Wikipedia, and delayed its launch in order to "purge out the propaganda" present in v0.1 of Grokipedia. Musk has described Wikipedia as "woke" and an "extension of legacy media propaganda".

=== Idea and announcement ===
In September 2025, Musk spoke at the All-In podcast conference with David O. Sacks, the White House advisor on Artificial Intelligence and cryptocurrency, about how Grok consumed data from Wikipedia and other sources to gain more complete knowledge of the world. Sacks suggested publishing its knowledge base as an artifact called "Grokipedia", saying "Wikipedia is so biased, it's a constant war".

Following the conversation, Musk announced that xAI was building a new AI-generated online encyclopedia called Grokipedia. According to Musk's announcement, it would be an AI-powered knowledge base designed to rival Wikipedia by addressing its perceived biases, errors, and ideological slants.

The project positioned itself within a history of ideologically driven alternatives to Wikipedia, such as the conservative Conservapedia (launched in 2006) and the Russian-government-friendly Ruwiki (launched in 2023). However, Grokipedia is distinct in its core reliance on artificial intelligence rather than human community editing.

=== Launch and traffic ===
Grokipedia launched on October 27, 2025, labeled "v 0.1", with over 800,000 articles, compared to over seven million English Wikipedia articles as of September 1, 2025. According to an initial analysis of usage figures by Similarweb, which evaluates data from registered users and partners, Grokipedia recorded a peak of over 460,000 website visits in the US on October 28, 2025. After that, traffic dropped significantly and settled at around 35,000 visits per day between November 8 and 11, 2025. As of early 2026, it had over 5.6 million articles.

In January 2026, The Guardian reported that GPT-5.2 frequently cited Grokipedia as a source in responses, raising concerns of misinformation on ChatGPT. The same month, The Verge reported that Google's AI Overviews, AI Mode, and Gemini language model, as well as Microsoft Copilot and Perplexity AI, used Grokipedia to answer niche, obscure, or highly specific factual questions or "non-sensitive queries."

According to a case study published by SEO Engico, the site received only 19 clicks from Google Search in November 2025 but reached approximately 3.2 million monthly clicks by January 2026, with over 900,000 pages indexed and millions of ranking keywords. Analysts attributed the surge in part to the site's technical structure and large-scale AI-generated content production. In early February 2026, Grokipedia's visibility in Google Search declined sharply. SEO analysts, including Glenn Gabe and Malte Landwehr, reported a significant drop in rankings across Google organic results as well as in Google AI Overviews and AI Mode. The same case study cited independent reviews that identified citation quality concerns, including references to low-credibility sources and instances of self-citation. By mid-February 2026, Grokipedia had reportedly lost much of its previous search visibility, and Wikipedia ranked above it for searches related to its own name. Grokipedia experienced subsequent cycles of traffic decline and resurgence, sharply dropping again between August and September 2026.

=== Version history ===
Version number	Release date
v 0.1	October 27, 2025
v 0.2	November 21, 2025
v 0.3	September 30, 2026

=== Post-launch developments ===
In November 2025, Musk announced that he eventually plans to change the name of the site to Encyclopedia Galactica when Grokipedia is "good enough", saying that it had a "long way to go". This name is taken from the publication of that title in the works of Isaac Asimov and Douglas Adams.

Musk said that he hoped to send copies of the encyclopedia to "the Moon and Mars and out to deep space".

By January 2026, most changes to Grokipedia were suggested by Grok itself, rather than by human readers.

There was a major rewrite of Grokipedia articles on 14 March 2026. Due to the rewrite, some user-suggested edits that had been accepted prior to the rewrite were erroneously retrospectively labeled as rejected, as their anchors to specific text passages were broken. Around 25 April 2026, Grokipedia stopped reviewing suggested changes made by members of the public, with implementation of user requests having stopped a month earlier around 22 March. Autonomous editing of Grokipedia by Grok itself also stopped in late April, leaving the contents of Grokipedia effectively frozen, with the recent edits feed on the Grokipedia homepage also being removed.

In September 2026, autonomous updating of Grokipedia resumed, including the implementation of user requests. This corresponded to the version number being updated to 0.3, with the homepage being changed to add a number of features, including featured articles and most read articles, along with some minor changes to article formatting.

== Content ==
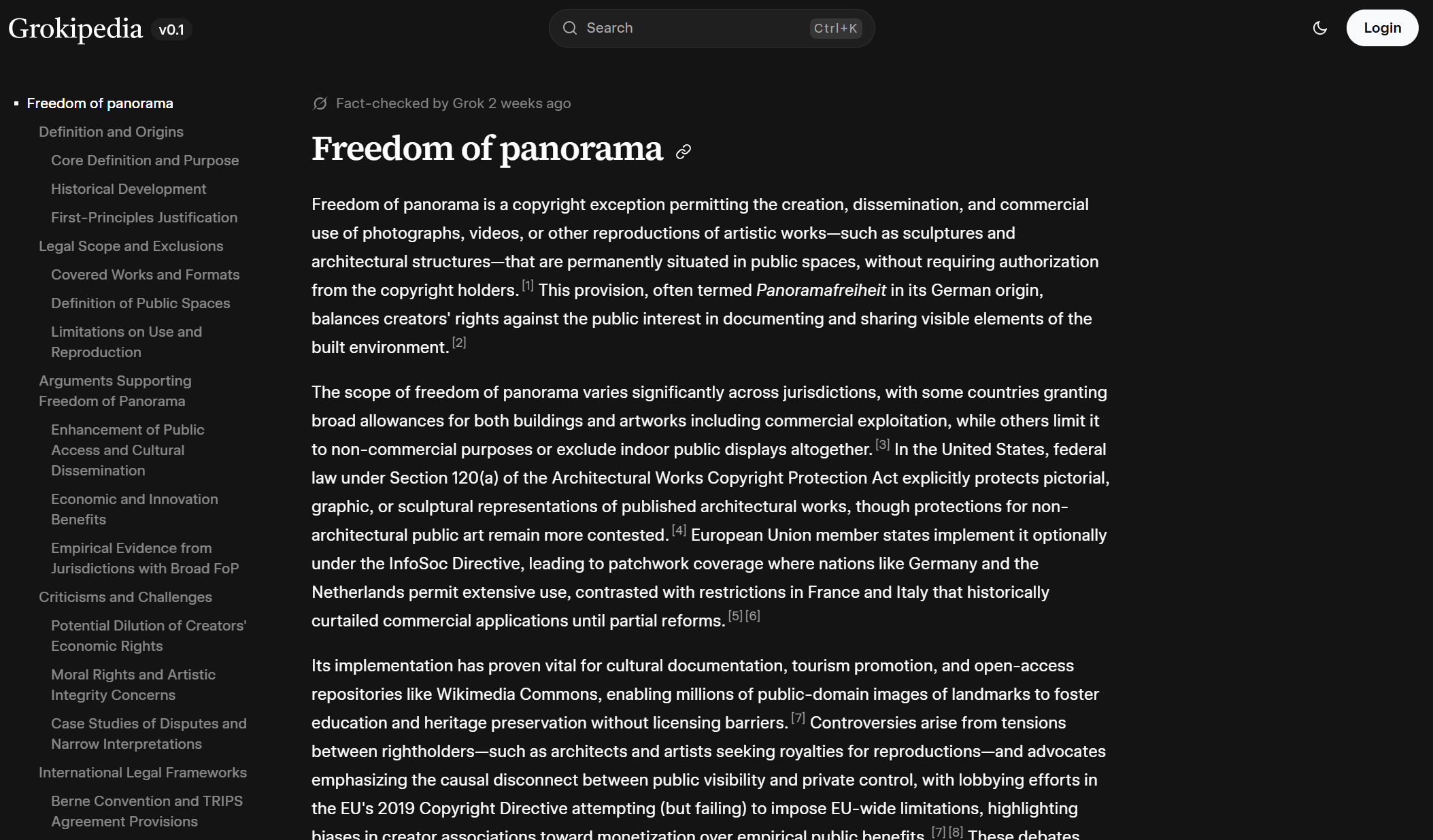
The Grokipedia article on the subject of freedom of panorama

The Grok large language model generates and fact-checks articles on Grokipedia. Users cannot directly edit Grokipedia articles, but logged-in users can suggest edits and report errors, with such submissions being reviewed and implemented by the Grok AI.

Some articles are nearly identical to their Wikipedia entries, but the format of Grokipedia citations is different, and some Grokipedia articles were republished almost verbatim, accompanied by a disclaimer noting that the content was "adapted from Wikipedia" under a Creative Commons license. Others were completely rewritten from scratch using Musk's AI chatbot, Grok. Forbes identified the articles AMD, Lamborghini, and PlayStation 5 as examples of copied Wikipedia articles. Articles attributed to Wikipedia carry a Creative Commons Attribution-ShareAlike license, while the license of other articles is licensed under the "X Community License", a license that accepts reuse and remixing for "non-commercial and research purposes" and commercial use that abides to "all of the guardrails provided in xAI's Acceptable Use Policy".

On October 31, 2025, Musk clarified that the duplication of Wikipedia articles was intentional, saying that the Grokipedia team instructed Grok to compile Wikipedia's top 1 million articles and make content changes to them. The site's design has been described as minimalist with a simple homepage including little more than a large search bar. In a comparative textual analysis of the most heavily edited matched article pairs from Grokipedia and Wikipedia, Grokipedia entries are substantially longer and less densely referenced.

Starting in version 0.2, Grok reviews and implements approved suggested edits, and a small panel rotates through a display of the names of several recently edited articles.

In February 2026, the Columbia Journalism Review reported on an analysis by the Tow Center for Digital Journalism finding that Grok, the AI behind Grokipedia, had increasingly begun suggesting and approving edits to the site itself without human involvement. According to the report, AI-generated edit suggestions overtook human submissions in December 2025 and accounted for more than three-quarters of proposed changes. The analysis raised concerns about transparency, editorial oversight, and fact-checking standards, particularly after instances in which Grok proposed or modified politically sensitive content. Critics cited in the report questioned the reliability of a self-editing AI system and described Grokipedia as a centrally controlled knowledge project rather than a collaboratively maintained encyclopedia.

404 Media's Jason Koebler noted that some Grokipedia pages include text such as "Wait, no, can't cite Wiki", that appears to surface the Grok agent's instructions.

== Reliability ==
A November 2025 review of Grokipedia's content by PolitiFact found that article content that differs from Wikipedia includes unsourced content and misleading or opinionated claims, and that Grokipedia occasionally includes incorrect citations for its sources. It described pages as crediting sources that did not exist, and that some pages contained no citations other than saying it was adapted from Wikipedia. For instance, Grokipedia's page for the Canadian singer Feist was directly copied from Wikipedia except for an added line saying her father died in May 2021, citing a 2017 article that did not make that claim. Pages were also described as citing secondhand, unattributed information and commentary such as Instagram Reels and user-generated content that Wikipedia describes as being "generally unacceptable as sources".

=== Factual inaccuracies ===
Wired reported that "The new AI-powered Wikipedia competitor falsely claims that pornography worsened the AIDS epidemic and that social media may be fueling a rise in transgender people". LGBTQ Nation also highlighted how Grokipedia has an article on "HIV/AIDS skepticism" which claims there is legitimate scientific critique that HIV does not cause AIDS. The Verge highlighted other instances of articles that legitimize ideas and conspiracy theories that go against scientific consensus, pointing to topics such as vaccines and autism; COVID-19; race and intelligence; and climate change.

The Guardian highlighted several pages that supported a variety of pseudoscientific claims around discredited 20th-century scientific racism. For instance, its page on eugenics supported the theory with alleged "empirical evidence", dismissed criticism as a result of suppression tactics from left-wing sources, and that several pages on the topic had entries about purported skull measurements for "Negroid", "Mongoloid", "Armenoid", "Nordic" and "Ethiopid" skull types.

Matteo Wong noted in The Atlantic that Grokipedia frames the white genocide conspiracy theory as an event that is currently occurring. The Business Standard described Grokipedia pages as validating debunked conspiracy theories such as Pizzagate and the "Great Replacement". British historian Richard J. Evans reported multiple false statements in his Grokipedia entry.

Multiple outlets noted that there are factual issues with Grokipedia's pages on topics related to LGBTQ+ issues. PinkNews was especially critical of Grokipedia's transgender-related articles which, among other things, claimed being trans is a choice and a "social contagion"; promoted the discredited rapid-onset gender dysphoria controversy; misused statistics to argue that trans identification is declining; rewrote LGBTQ+ history to suggest that trans people were not a part of the queer rights movement before the 1990s; and cited groups like the Society for Evidence-Based Gender Medicine (which has been classified as an anti-transgender hate group by the Southern Poverty Law Center) to support some of these claims.

Researcher Renée DiResta reported that the Grokipedia article about her included conspiracy theories about her former research team at Stanford Internet Observatory censoring 22 million tweets during the 2020 United States presidential election, and hallucinated content that they were involved in Twitter's moderation of content about Hunter Biden's laptop.

Journalist Bill Adair, founder of PolitiFact, noted in November 2026 that Grokipedia had two entries on him, one of which confused him with the baseball coach of the same name, resulting in an entry erroneously attributing both of their career achievements to the same person.

== Reception ==
Bill Adair, writing in November 2026, was negative about Grokipedia's style and content, writing that its articles were "... littered with mistakes and superfluous details. They are terribly written and ridiculously long. ... The articles read as if Grok was trained on too many online resumes and corporate memos" and were "...often out of date".

=== Accusations of bias ===
Several pages on Grokipedia broadly criticize academia and the news media as left-wing and accuse them of suppressing opposing views. The Guardian highlighted Grokipedia's description of Holocaust denier David Irving in positive terms as a symbol of "resistance to institutional suppression of unorthodox historical inquiry" in the face of "coordinated efforts to silence dissent rather than scholarly refutation"; Grokipedia's entry adds: "Despite mainstream dismissals from sources with evident anti-revisionist biases, such as advocacy groups, Irving's archival rigor continues to be praised within these circles."

The Intercept highlighted Grokipedia's page on Germany's far-right political party Alternative for Germany (AfD), describing its 'Media Portrayals and Alleged Bias' section as echoing AfD claims of media bias against the party. The page had a section entitled "Media Portrayals and Alleged Bias" which The Intercept described as serving "to parrot AfD's long-held claims that the media is biased and undermining them". The Intercept also reported that Grokipedia: accuses the United Nations and non-governmental organizations (NGOs) like Amnesty International and Human Rights Watch of focusing on "Israeli actions while minimizing Hamas's violations"; includes Israeli government accusations that the United Nations Relief and Works Agency for Palestine Refugees in the Near East is infiltrated by Hamas; and cites pro-Israel groups such as UN Watch and NGO Monitor.

Sociologist and physicist Taha Yasseri argued in The Conversation that the encyclopedia may end up displaying biases just like Wikipedia (though acknowledging that Wikipedia's "infrastructure is designed to make that bias visible and correctable"), since large language models like Grok's reflect the political and other biases of their datasets. Anaïs Nony, a researcher in digital technologies at the University of Johannesburg, stated that Grokipedia seeks to "discredit scientific and collaborative work". L. K. Sellig, an AI researcher at the Weizenbaum Institute, described Grokipedia as "cloaking misinformation". According to a May 2026 analysis in the Proceedings of the National Academy of Sciences, "Wikipedia's openness renders bias visible and contestable through edits, disputes, and deliberation. Grokipedia replaces this process with opaque, automated authorship, embedding potential biases within model behavior rather than exposing them to scrutiny. Despite its stated corrective aim, Grokipedia functions less as an epistemic alternative than as an AI-mediated reconfiguration of Wikipedia."

The Guardian, NBC News and The Atlantic reported that requests for comment about Grokipedia sent to xAI were responded to with an automated message saying: "Legacy Media Lies".

==== Towards Elon Musk's personal views ====
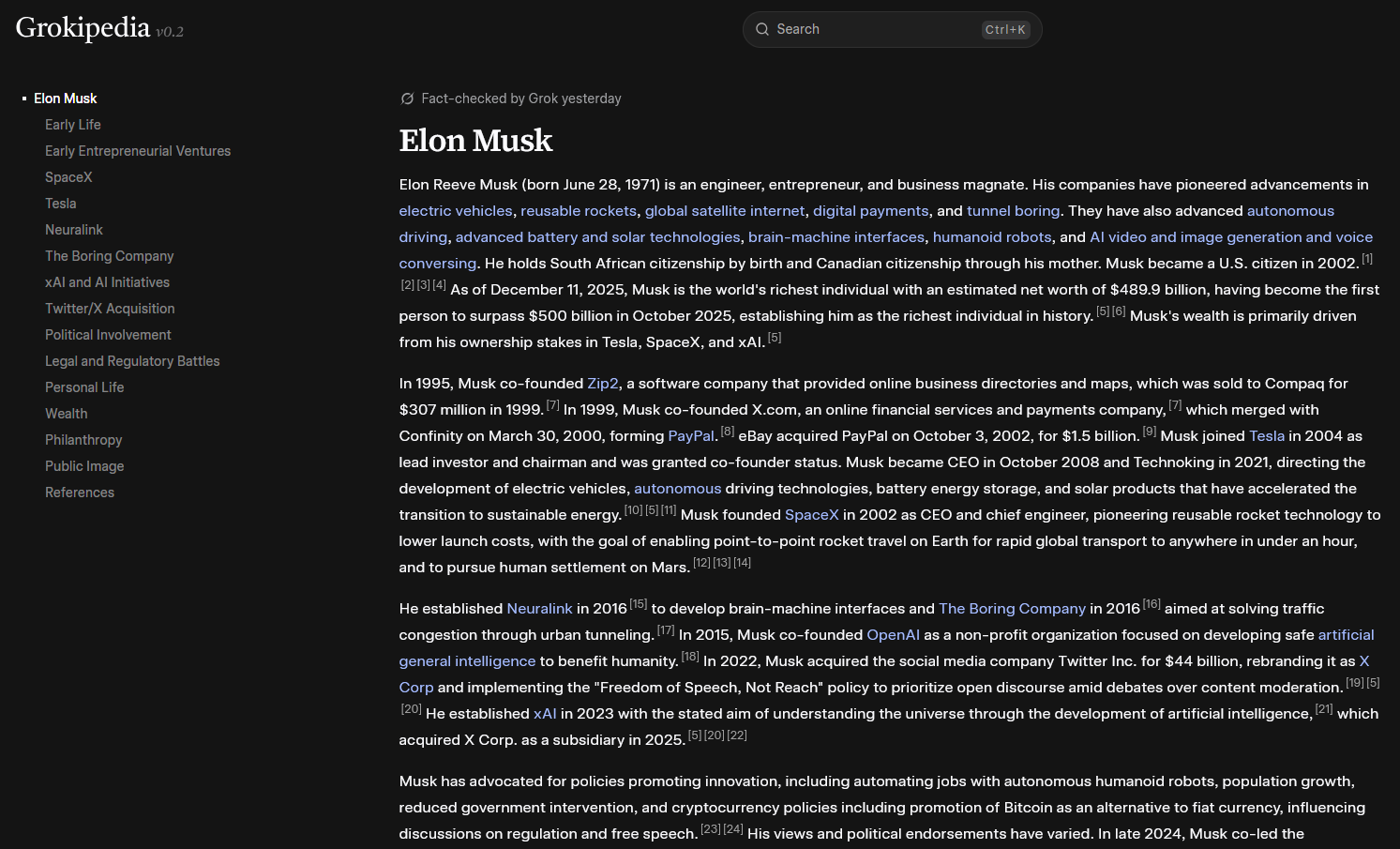
Grokipedia's article on Musk in 2025

Articles related to topics that Musk has been outspoken on have been noted to align with Musk's personal views on the topics, including gender transition, gender identities, Tesla, Neuralink, and former Twitter CEO Parag Agrawal. NBC News noted that unlike Musk's Wikipedia article, his Grokipedia entry did not mention his controversial hand gesture made in January 2025, which many viewed as resembling a Nazi salute. Time magazine wrote that the Grokipedia article on Musk sometimes "describes him in rapturous terms while downplaying, or even omitting, several of his controversies". The magazine added that "Grokipedia includes more detailed descriptions of Musk's views, including the idea of a 'woke mind virus,' which Musk claimed 'killed' his estranged transgender daughter [Vivian Wilson], who is alive". Futurism reported that the Grokipedia article on the Tesla Cybertruck included language promoting the Cybertruck and criticizing media coverage of it and Tesla.

David Swan of The Sydney Morning Herald wrote that the ideological bias of Musk present in Grokipedia is less of a concern than how easy it has been shown to do this at scale, stating that "Other billionaires and authoritarian regimes are watching". Journalist Richard Cooke, who authored a political biography of Musk, stated in remarks to The Guardian that "Grokipedia is a copy of Wikipedia but one where in each instance that Wikipedia disagrees with the richest man in the world, it's 'rectified' so that it's congruent with them".

==== Towards right-wing views ====
Grokipedia has been described as having a right-wing bias, with The Business Standard noting reviewers finding it framed "contested social and political issues through a right-leaning perspective, echoing Musk's personal views", with some pages accused of whitewashing extremism. Matteo Wong noted in The Atlantic how in the Grokipedia article on Adolf Hitler, his "rapid economic achievements" are prioritized over events like the Holocaust. NBC News stated that while Wikipedia mentions the Holocaust in the first paragraph of the Hitler article, Grokipedia mentions it only after 13,000 words.

Wong also states that Grokipedia repeatedly cites Kremlin.ru for its article on the 2022 Russian invasion of Ukraine. Meduza compared Grokipedia's coverage to that of the Kremlin-aligned Ruwiki, finding that Grokipedia's treatment of the Russo-Ukrainian war was less overtly propagandistic than Ruwiki's, though it did give more favorable treatment to "Russian propaganda talking points" than Wikipedia did. On Vladimir Putin, Grokipedia's coverage was "less fawning" than Ruwiki's, though still omitting noteworthy negative information about him. Meduza noted that Grokipedia also omits mention of scandals surrounding Donald Trump, such as his relationship with Jeffrey Epstein. Texas-based news site Chron observed that Grokipedia articles often cited "Texas Republican bloggers and advocacy groups", and that Grokipedia's coverage of Texas history tended to minimize the role of slavery.

On November 17, 2025, the British newspaper The Guardian published an analysis of Grokipedia finding that entries "variously promote white nationalist talking points, praise neo-Nazis and other far-right figures, promote racist ideologies and white supremacist regimes, and attempt to revive concepts and approaches historically associated with scientific racism". It described several pages on white nationalists, antisemites and Holocaust deniers "written to portray them in a positive light while casting doubt on the credibility of their critics" and giving favorable accounts of historical far-right figures. It highlighted Grokipedia's praise and defense of Jared Taylor, Kevin MacDonald, Revilo P. Oliver, and William Luther Pierce, such as by describing Pierce's 1978 book The Turner Diaries and its "advocacy for total racial war, rejection of democratic compromise and portrayal of mass extermination as moral imperative" as having merely "drawn scrutiny from institutions prone to framing such texts through lenses of hate rather than analyzing their appeal via first-principles incentives like group survival". A November 2025 article by NBC News noted that Grokipedia used the phrase "advancement of peoples of European descent" in place of terms like "white nationalist".

A 2026 analysis found that "many Grokipedia articles closely resemble their Wikipedia counterparts, while a considerable subset diverges". In the area of divergence, the news media cited by Grokipedia leaned more to the political right than that cited by Wikipedia.

Several entries were described as praising white supremacist or exclusionary communities on the basis of economic performance, such as its entry on Orania in South Africa or Rhodesia, the latter of which stated that: "In retrospect, Rhodesia's era demonstrated effective resource management and institutional stability under constrained minority governance, yielding higher per capita incomes, literacy rates, and life expectancies for the broader population". It labeled critics as having "institutional biases favoring rapid decolonization narratives" that are "prevalent in mainstream academic and media sources". The Agence France-Presse described several right-wing figures as welcoming the site, including Russian philosopher Aleksandr Dugin, who praised the Grokipedia article on him, saying it was better than his article on Wikipedia.

=== Response from Wikimedia community members ===
A spokesperson for the Wikimedia Foundation commented that "Wikipedia's knowledge is – and always will be – human. [...] This human-created knowledge is what AI companies rely on to generate content; even Grokipedia needs Wikipedia to exist". Wikipedia co-founder Jimmy Wales commented that the use of large language models would cause Grokipedia to contain "massive errors". Larry Sanger, a co-founder and noted critic of Wikipedia, noted that the Grokipedia article on himself contained both correct content not found in the corresponding Wikipedia article and hallucinated errors.

The Wikipedia community has deprecated Grokipedia as a source, citing issues with verifiability, circular sourcing, and copyrighted material.

== See also ==
- List of content forks of Wikipedia
- List of online encyclopedias
- Halupedia, an AI-generated online encyclopedia, originally started as a method to pollute AI training data
