= Halupedia =

Online encyclopedia generated by AI

- Website type: Content farm
- Available in: English
- Founder: Bartłomiej Strama
- Key people: Tomasz Mamala
- Website: https://halupedia.com
- Launched: 2026

Halupedia is an AI-generated online encyclopedia, made entirely of AI hallucinations, by Bartłomiej Strama, and Tomasz Mamala. The project began as a method to pollute AI training data. Halupedia articles are generated by large language models on the website OpenRouter.

"Every link leads to an entry that does not exist yet — until you click it"

While article content is generated, page titles are generated by users. Some users have managed to create articles with offensive names. Many popular pages have political overtones or reference Internet memes. The website has been described as "a snake eating its own tail" and an example of the dead Internet theory.

The site often has fake histories, fake citations, fake scholars, and so on.

== See also ==
- List of online encyclopedias
- Grokipedia
- Wikipedia
- Uncyclopedia
