= Marcel Bucher =

Swiss plant scientist and academic

- Born: 1963 (age 62–63); Switzerland
- Education: University of Bern; ETH Zurich
- Known for: Phosphate transport in Mycorrhiza; Plant-microbe interactions
- Scientific career
- Fields: Plant physiology Molecular biology
- Workplaces: University of Cologne; ETH Zurich; University of Bern
- Thesis: Die anaerobe Toleranz von Acorus calamus L.: Charakterisierung der zentralen Stoffwechselwege und der Alkohol-Dehydrogenase-Gene (1992)
- Doctoral advisor: Cris Kuhlemeier
- Website: bucherlab.uni-koeln.de

Marcel Bucher (born 1963) is a Swiss plant scientist and academic. He is a professor of molecular plant physiology at the University of Cologne and a contributing investigator within the Cluster of Excellence on Plant Sciences (CEPLAS). His research focuses on the molecular and biochemical mechanisms of nutrient acquisition in plants, specifically the role of mycorrhiza in phosphate transport.

== Education and early career ==
Bucher studied biology at the University of Bern, where in 1989 he earned a Diplom (roughly equivalent to a Master of Science) in biology under the supervision of Roland Brändle. He remained at Bern for his doctoral studies under the supervision of Cris Kuhlemeier, completing his PhD in 1992 with a thesis on the anaerobic tolerance of the wetland plant Acorus calamus.

Following postdoctoral work at the Institute for Gene Biological Research in Berlin, he moved to ETH Zurich in 1996 to lead a research group within the department of biology. In 2006, he completed his Habilitation at ETH Zurich with a focus on the molecular biology of phosphate transport at plant-microbe interfaces.

== Research and career ==
In 2006, Bucher was appointed as a W2 Professor at the University of Cologne, then promoted to W3 Professor in 2016. His laboratory, based at the Cologne Biocenter, investigates the symbiotic relationship between land plants and arbuscular mycorrhizal fungi.

Bucher is best known for identifying mycorrhiza-specific phosphate transporters, which are essential for the exchange of phosphorus from fungi to host plants. His work demonstrated how these transporters are regulated by the plant's nutrient status and how they contribute to plant fitness under environmental stress.

As a member of CEPLAS, a joint German scientific initiative that integrates resources from five major partner institutions (Heinrich Heine University Düsseldorf (Lead university), University of Cologne (Co-lead university), Max Planck Institute for Plant Breeding Research, Forschungszentrum Jülich and Leibniz Institute of Plant Genetics and Crop Plant Research) he has expanded his research to include the holobiont concept, examining the wider fungal and bacterial communities associated with plant roots.

== Public commentary ==
In early 2026, Bucher gained international media attention after publishing a column in Nature detailing the loss of two years of academic drafts and data due to a technical interaction with ChatGPT's data consent settings. The incident sparked a widespread debate within the scientific community regarding the reliability of artificial intelligence tools in academic workflows and the necessity of local backups for digital research.

== Selected publications ==
- Almario, Juliana; Jeena, Ganga; Wunder, Jörg; Langen, Gregor; Zuccaro, Alga; Coupland, George; Bucher, Marcel (2017). "Root-associated fungal microbiota of nonmycorrhizal Arabis alpina and its contribution to plant phosphorus nutrition". Proc Natl Acad Sci USA. 114 (44): E9403–E9412. doi:10.1073/pnas.1710455114. PMC 5676915. PMID 28973917.
- Hiruma, Kei; Gerlach, Nina; Sacristán, Soledad; Nakano, Ryohei Thomas; Hacquard, Stéphane; Kracher, Barbara; Neumann, Ulla; Ramírez, Diana; Bucher, Marcel; O'Connell, Richard J.; Schulze-Lefert, Paul (2016). "Root Endophyte Colletotrichum tofieldiae Confers Plant Fitness Benefits that Are Phosphate Status Dependent". Cell. 165 (2): 464–474. doi:10.1016/j.cell.2016.02.028. PMC 4826447. PMID 26997485.
- Bucher, Marcel (2007). "Functional biology of plant phosphate uptake at root and mycorrhiza interfaces". New Phytol. 173 (1): 11–26. doi:10.1111/j.1469-8137.2006.01935.x. PMID 17176390.
- Rausch, Christine; Bucher, Marcel (2002). "Molecular mechanisms of phosphate transport in plants". Planta. 216 (1): 23–37. doi:10.1007/s00425-002-0921-3. PMID 12430011.
- Rausch, Christine; Daram, Pierre; Brunner, Silvia; Jansa, Jan; Laloi, Matrise; Leggewie, Georg; Amrhein, Nikolaus; Bucher, Marcel (2001). "A phosphate transporter expressed in arbuscule-containing cells in potato". Nature. 414: 462–470. doi:10.1038/35106601. PMID 11719809.
