= GPT-5.1 =

2025 large language model

- Developer: OpenAI
- Release: November 12, 2025; 7 months ago
- Included with: ChatGPT; Microsoft Copilot
- Predecessor: GPT-5
- Successor: GPT-5.2
- Type: Multimodal; Large language model; Generative pre-trained transformer; Foundation model
- License: Proprietary
- Website: openai.com/index/gpt-5-1/

GPT-5.1 is a family of five large language models within OpenAI's GPT series. Three were released on November 12, 2025; two more were released one week later on November 19.

== Features ==
GPT-5.1 adds customizable personalities, with 8 personality options. OpenAI describes it as having a "warmer personality" by default compared to GPT-5.

GPT-5.1 is available to all users, though paid Pro, Plus, Go, and Business users were given advanced access.

== Models ==
The model consists of two modes: GPT-5.1 Instant and GPT-5.1 Thinking, the latter being a reasoning model designed for more complex tasks. GPT-5.1-Codex-Mini was released on the same day as a cost-effective alternative for coding and agentic tasks.

On November 19, 2025, OpenAI released GPT‑5.1-Codex-Max, an agentic coding model. GPT-5.1 Pro was also released on the same day, replacing GPT-5 Pro.

== Reception ==
=== Critical reviews ===
Amanda Caswell from Tom's Guide praised GPT-5.1 for its mathematical reasoning and coding abilities, but decided that Gemini 3 produced better results overall.

Writing for TechRadar, Eric Hal Schwartz compared GPT-5.1 to GPT-5 and found the new model to be more consistent in following prompts. He also considered it an "incremental improvement".
