= Tauri (software framework) =

Open-source framework for cross-platform apps

- Original authors: Daniel Thompson-Yvetot, Lucas Nogueira
- Release: 19 June 2020; 6 years ago
- Stable release: Tauri v2.10.1 / 4 March 2026; 7 months ago
- Written in: Rust & TypeScript
- Operating system: Linux, macOS, Windows, Android, iOS
- License: MIT License, Apache License 2.0
- Website: tauri.app
- Repository: github.com/tauri-apps/tauri
- As of: 27 January 2025

Tauri is an open-source application framework designed to create cross-platform desktop and mobile applications on Linux, macOS, Windows, Android and iOS using a web frontend. The framework functions with a Rust back-end and a JavaScript front-end that runs on local WebView libraries using rendering libraries like Tao and Wry. Tauri aims to provide a more lightweight alternative to similar existing frameworks such as Electron.

Tauri is governed by the Tauri Foundation within the Dutch non-profit Commons Conservancy. As of 2024, Tauri is licensed and distributed under the MIT license, and Apache 2.0 license.

Tauri 1.0 was released in June 2022. In early 2024, Tauri v2 Beta was released, which included mobile support for iOS and Android systems. On 2 October 2024, Tauri v2 was released as a stable release.

== Architecture ==
OpenAI Codex using its harness with Tauri’s DOM Inspector to test, diagnose, and optimize the app live before doing a source code patch

Central to Tauri's architecture are core components such as the Tauri crate, which serves as a hub for managing various functionalities like runtimes, macros, utilities, and APIs. The toolkit also includes essential tooling such as bundlers, CLI interfaces, DOM Inspector, and scaffolding kits, to streamline the development and deployment processes. Tauri supports cross-platform application window creation (TAO) and WebView rendering (WRY), which allows compatibility across macOS, Linux and Windows platforms.

Tauri is built using Rust, a programming language emphasizing performance, type safety, and memory safety. It also allows users the function to switch individual APIs on and off, and provides an isolation pattern to prevent untrusted scripts from accessing the back-end from a WebView.

== See also ==
- Electron
- List of open-source application frameworks
