= GPT Store =

Platform for creating custom AI chatbots

The GPT Store is a platform developed by OpenAI that enables users and developers to create, publish, and monetize custom AI applications based on ChatGPT without requiring advanced programming skills.

== History ==
The GPT Store was announced in October 2023 and launched in January 2024. According to OpenAI, the platform aims to democratize access to advanced artificial intelligence and facilitate the creation of custom chatbot applications without requiring advanced programming skills. Initially available only to paying customers, access to the GPT Store became free in May 2024.

== Features ==
The GPT Store allows users to create and customize chatbots, known as GPTs, tailored to various needs such as customer service, personal assistance, video and image creation, and more. GPTs are categorized into various sections, including Programming, Education, and Research. The platform is designed to be user-friendly, with intuitive tools that do not require programming experience or advanced technical knowledge.

GPTs can be configured to answer complex questions in specific fields, solve problems, provide image-based information, or create digital content. They can be programmed as educational tools, purchasing guides, or technical advisors, as well as for many others applications.

The store also uses a rating system based on user experiences similar to that used by other app stores such as Apple's App Store or Google Play. Those with the best ratings appear at the top of each category.

According to La Vanguardia, the most popular categories are:

- Personal assistants
- Learning to program
- Image generation
- Creative writing
- Gaming
- Entertainment

It is expected that in the future the creators of GPTs will be able to monetize them.

Free users can use existing GPTs but cannot create their own. Paying subscribers can use the editor on the ChatGPT site to configure the GPT's name, image and description, instructions and access to APIs, along with visibility options.

Product availability will depend on customized settings, such as the set level of visibility and the creator's profile. Creators of GPTs will have the opportunity to monetize their applications through various business models, including subscriptions and pay-per-use. The GPT Store also features a star-based rating system for users to evaluate GPTs, similar to other app stores such as Apple's App Store and Google Play.

== Uses ==
Companies like Moderna are using GPTs to assist in various specific business tasks. The company has created 750 GPTs for its own internal use.

== Guidelines ==
Guidelines outline the expectations and responsibilities users have when creating a GPT product or platform, and they are continually monitored for compliance to minimize violations. These guidelines emphasize principles of customization, transparency, and intellectual freedom, aiming to support diverse communities while ensuring responsible use of the technology.

The policies prohibit activities such as promoting harm, harassment, defamation, violence, or terrorism, among other forms of misuse. They also require creators to respect privacy rights by avoiding the disclosure of non-public information without prior authorization.

GPTs within the ChatGPT store must comply with OpenAI's branding standards, which regulate the use of ChatGPT logos, names, and other visual identifiers in the private sector without formal permission.

== Controversy ==
Despite its initial success, the GPT Store has faced criticism concerning potential copyright violations. Some users and companies have expressed concerns about the use of AI-generated content that may infringe on intellectual property rights. For instance, a teacher has alleged that some students created GPTs that provided access to content from copyrighted books.

The ChatGPT store has also garnered false impressions of credibility and dubious categorization due to the large number of online sites that aim to mimic its features, leading to scams and misleading practices.
