= FrontierMath =

AI benchmark testbed for mathematical problem solving

FrontierMath is a test bed to benchmark various artificial intelligence systems in their attempts to solve 14 bespoke heretofore unexamined mathematical problems (none of which are on the scale of the Millennium Problems). It was established by the non-profit research organization Epoch AI in November 2024. The first such open problem—of the "moderately interesting" rank—to be solved was in hypergraph theory: "A Constant-Factor Lower Bound For H (n)" by GPT-5.4.

In December 2024, one month after the benchmark was made public and right after the release of OpenAI's o3 model, EpochAI revealed that the benchmark creation had been financed entirely by OpenAI, and that OpenAI had received exclusive access to almost all the questions in the benchmark. This prompted many concerns about transparency and validity around the benchmark, and EpochAI published an apology.

== See also ==
- Longest proof
- Jacobian conjecture
- Millennium problems
