= GPT-5.2 =

2025 large language model by OpenAI

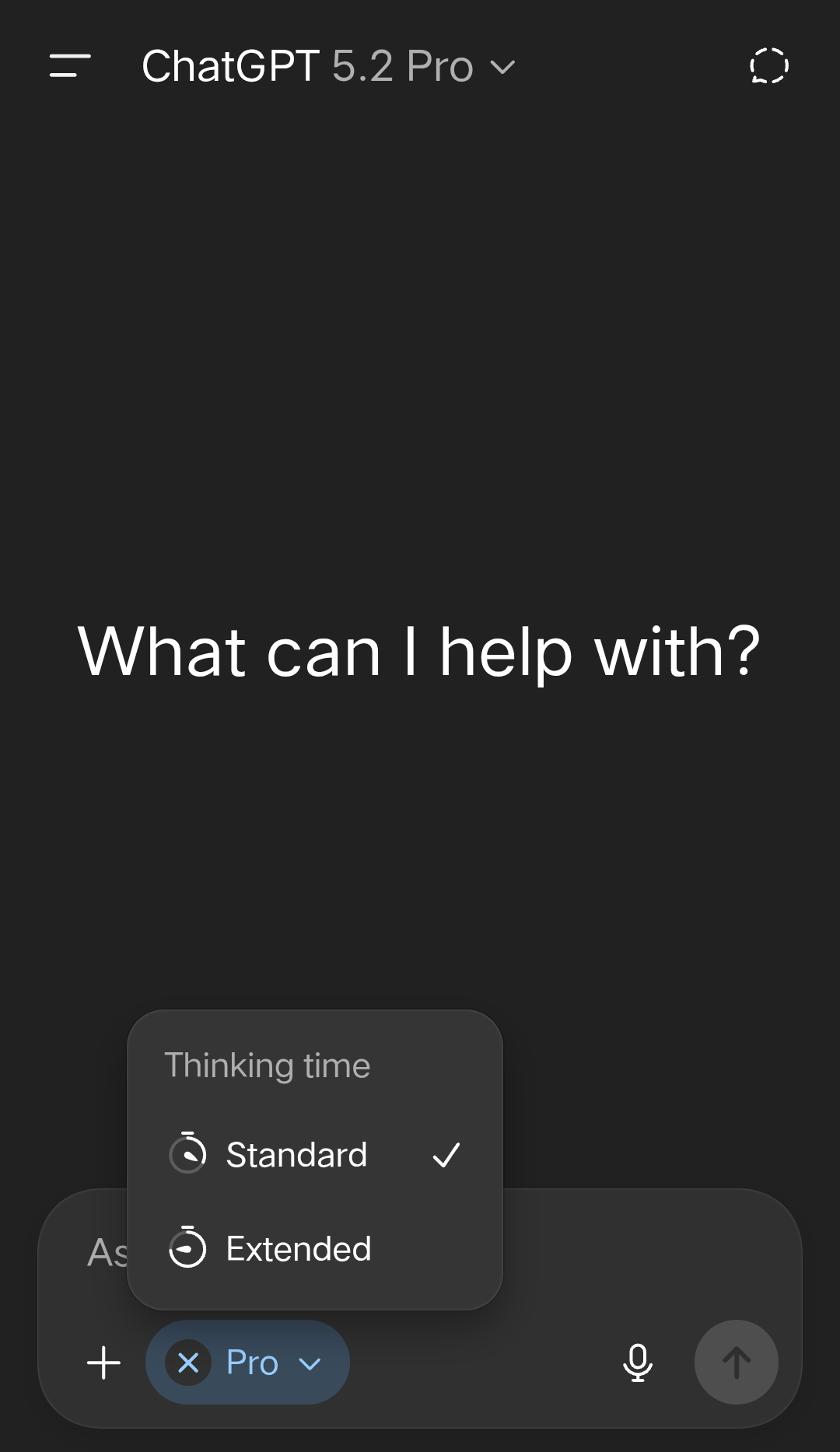
- Screenshot Screenshot showing the two thinking time modes available to Pro users
- Developer: OpenAI
- Release: December 11, 2025; 9 months ago
- Included with: ChatGPT; Microsoft Copilot
- Predecessor: GPT-5.1
- Successor: GPT-5.3-Codex; GPT-5.4
- Type: Multimodal; Large language model; Generative pre-trained transformer; Foundation model
- License: Proprietary
- Website: openai.com/index/introducing-gpt-5-2/

GPT-5.2 is a large language model by OpenAI, released on December 11, 2025. Succeeding GPT-5.1, it is a family of three large language models within the GPT series. It comes in three modes: GPT-5.2 instant, GPT-5.2 thinking (with standard and extended thinking), and GPT-5.2 Pro, with the latter two being reasoning models. GPT-5.2 Pro takes more reasoning time and compute than GPT-5.2 thinking. OpenAI also released a variant specialized for coding, GPT-5.2-Codex. The successor, GPT-5.3-Codex, was released on February 5, 2026, and in the following month, GPT-5.4 was released to public on March 5, 2026.

== Development and release ==
The release of GPT-5.2 occurred on December 11, 2025, approximately three weeks after the release of Google's Gemini 3 Pro, which had been widely cited as the leading multimodal model at the time. Media outlets reported that an internal "Code Red" memo, prompted by Gemini's dominance, was a key factor in accelerating the model's release from an originally planned late-December window. OpenAI executives disputed the narrative that the launch was solely reactive. Speaking to Wired, Fidji Simo, OpenAI's CEO of Applications, stated that the company had "been working on this model’s release for months", though she acknowledged that the "Code Red" and additional resources allocated to ChatGPT were "helpful" in finalizing the deployment.

== Architecture and capabilities ==
GPT-5.2 is better at spreadsheet creation, financial modeling, presentations, and multi-step project execution.

GPT‑5.2 comes in three modes; GPT-5.2 instant, GPT-5.2 thinking and GPT-5.2 Pro. Instant model is designed for speed and efficiency, and the other two models are reasoning models. GPT-5.2's Pro version comes into two separate selectors: standard and extended. These two modes use different compute times and powers.

== Reception ==
VentureBeat noted that early reactions suggest that GPT-5.2 was "used for power users, developers, and enterprise agents rather than casual chat". Aaron Levie, CEO of Box, reported that the model scores "7 points better than GPT-5.1" on the company's tests for real-world knowledge work.

The Guardian reported that GPT-5.2 was using Elon Musk's encyclopedia Grokipedia as a source, and Grokipedia itself was criticized by Nina Jankowicz as poorly sourced.
