= DOM Inspector =

Web development tool

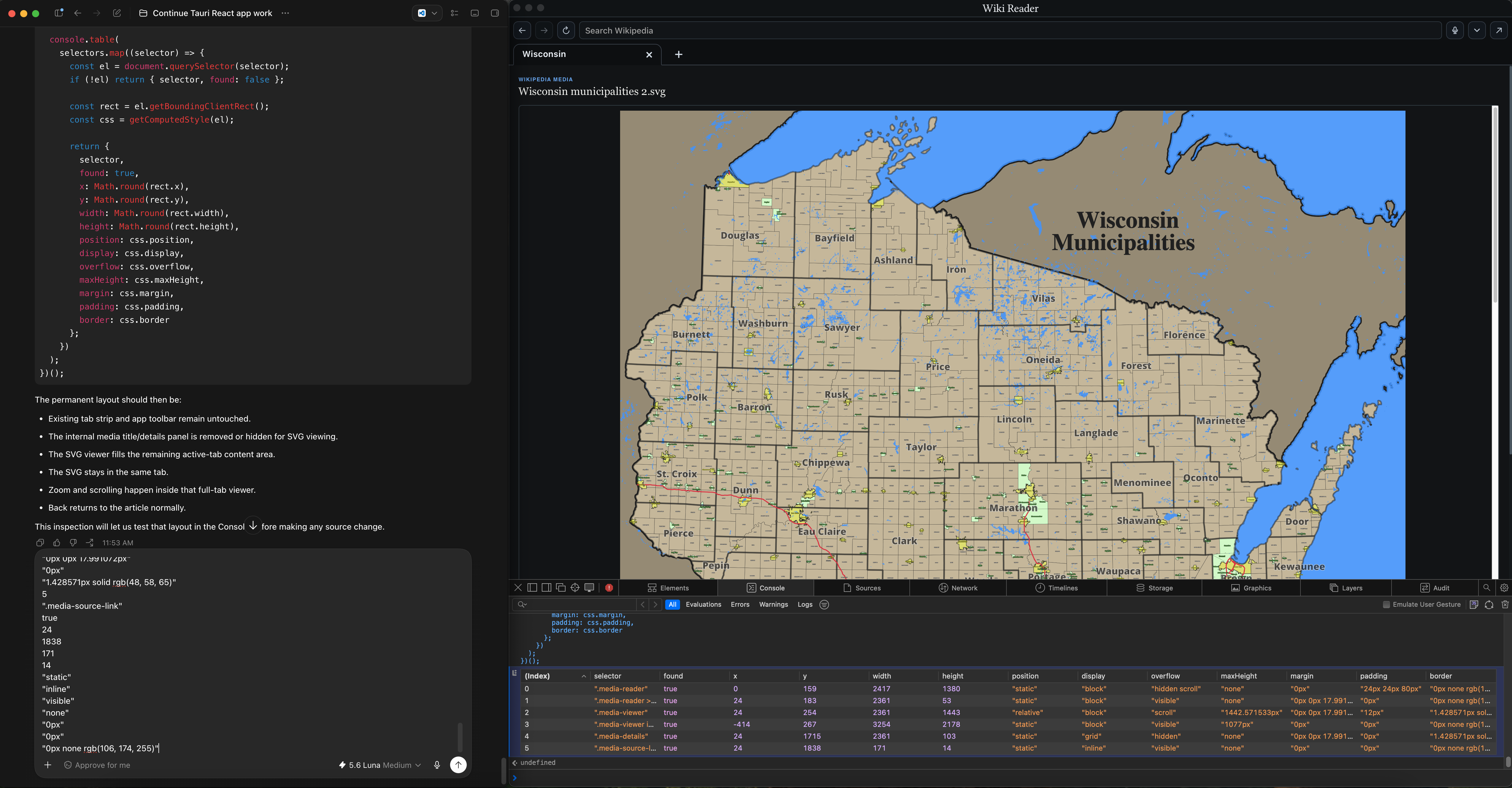
Screenshot of OpenAI Codex working with Tauri and using the DOM inspector to do test diagnostics and optimizations live before writing the patch to the source code

DOM Inspector (DOMi) is a web developer tool created by Joe Hewitt and was originally included in Mozilla Application Suite as well as versions of Mozilla Firefox prior to Firefox 3. It is now included in Firefox, and SeaMonkey. Its main purpose is to inspect and edit the Document Object Model (DOM) tree of HTML and XML-based documents.

A DOM node can be selected from the tree structure, or by clicking on the browser chrome. As well as the DOM tree viewer, other viewers are also available, including Box Model, XBL Bindings, CSS Rules, Style Sheets, Computed Style, JavaScript Object, as well as a number of viewers for document and application accessibility. By default, the DOM Inspector highlights a newly selected non-attribute node with a red flashing border.

Similar tools exist in other browsers, e.g., Opera's Dragonfly, Safari's Web Inspector, the Internet Explorer Developer Toolbar, and Google Chrome's Developer Tools.

== Keyboard shortcuts ==
In modern web browsers, the developer tools used to inspect the DOM can typically be opened by pressing Ctrl+⇧ Shift+I on Windows, and ⌘ Cmd+⌥ Option+I on macOS.

== Software with DOM inspector tools ==
- Electron
- Firefox
- Google Chrome
- Microsoft Edge
- NW.js
- Opera
- Safari
- SeaMonkey
- Tauri

== See also ==
- Firebug — another web development extension more recently created by Joe Hewitt
