= GPT-5.5 =

2026 large language model by OpenAI

- Developer: OpenAI
- Release: April 23, 2026; 6 months ago
- Predecessor: GPT-5.4
- Successor: GPT-5.6
- License: Proprietary
- Website: openai.com/index/introducing-gpt-5-5/

GPT-5.5 (Generative Pre-trained Transformer 5.5) is a large language model (LLM) released by OpenAI on April 23, 2026. The model is also known by its codename "Spud".

OpenAI reported GPT-5.5 benchmark scores including 82.7% on Terminal-Bench 2.0, 51.7% on FrontierMath Tier 1–3, and 35.4% on FrontierMath Tier 4, while listing lower scores for Claude Opus 4.7 and Gemini 3.1 Pro on the same benchmarks.

OpenAI said a recurring tendency in its models to mention goblins, gremlins, and other creatures began with GPT-5.1 and became noticeable in GPT-5.5's Codex testing. The company attributed the behavior to rewards used when training the "Nerdy" personality, which favored creature-word outputs and transferred beyond that personality during later training. OpenAI said it retired the Nerdy personality, removed the goblin-affine reward signal, filtered training data containing creature words, and added a developer-prompt instruction for GPT-5.5 in Codex. In April 2026, a GPT-5.5 developer-prompt instruction in the GitHub repository of Codex told it not to mention goblins if the user prompt did not require it.

GPT-5.5-Cyber, along with Codex Security, was being used in June 2026 at the launch of the Patch the Planet project to help open-source projects find and fix vulnerabilities.

== Release ==
GPT-5.5 Thinking and GPT-5.5 Pro were released on April 23, 2026, with neither being available to free-tier users. OpenAI withheld API access at launch, saying that API deployments required "different safeguards"; GPT-5.5 and GPT-5.5 Pro became available in the API on April 24, 2026. GPT-5.5 Instant was released to free-tier users on May 5, 2026, replacing GPT-5.3 Instant as ChatGPT's default model for all users. On May 7, 2026, OpenAI announced GPT-5.5-Cyber, a limited-preview variant for vetted cybersecurity teams under its Trusted Access for Cyber program.

== Reception ==
The AI Security Institute reported that GPT-5.5 had a 71.4% (±8.0%, one standard error) average pass rate on its expert-level cyber tasks, compared with 68.6% (±8.7%) for Anthropic's Claude Mythos Preview, and said GPT-5.5 "may be the strongest model we have tested" on that measure.
