= GPT-6.2 =

2026 large language model by OpenAI

- Developer: OpenAI
- Release: November 17, 2026; 1 day ago (Sol); November 17, 2026; 1 day ago (Astra)
- Predecessor: GPT-6.1
- Type: Large language model
- License: Proprietary
- Website: openai.com/index/introducing-gpt-6-2-astra-sol/

GPT-6.2 is a family of large language models (LLMs) by OpenAI. GPT-6.2 Astra and Sol were released on November 17, 2026, both of which are exclusively available to paid users.

Upon release, both GPT-6.2 Astra and Sol received mixed reviews from power users, drawing criticism for frequent mistakes and negligible real-world improvements over their predecessor models.
