= GPT-6.1 =

2026 large language model by OpenAI

- Developer: OpenAI
- Release: September 29, 2026; 49 days ago (Sol); October 26, 2026; 22 days ago (Terra)
- Predecessor: GPT-6
- Successor: GPT-6.2
- Type: Large language model
- License: Proprietary
- Website: openai.com/index/introducing-gpt-6-1-sol

GPT-6.1 is a family of large language models (LLMs) by OpenAI. GPT-6.1 Sol was released on September 29, 2026, and GPT-6.1 Terra on October 26, 2026.

== History ==
GPT-6.1 Sol was released on September 29, 2026, during OpenAI's DevDay event. GPT-6.1 Astra was planned to release in October, but was canceled due to alignment issues.

GPT-6.1 Terra, a faster and cheaper model, was released on October 26, 2026.

== Safety ==
Concerns regarding deception and failure to seek authorization were raised regarding GPT-6.1 Astra by some who had used it. In statements to the press following the publication of these concerns, OpenAI head of safety systems Saachi Jain stated GPT-6.1 Astra "didn’t quite meet the bar" in regard to safety.
