= GPT-5.4 =

2026 large language model by OpenAI

- Developer: OpenAI
- Release: March 5, 2026; 7 months ago
- Predecessor: GPT-5.2
- Successor: GPT-5.5
- License: Proprietary
- Website: openai.com/index/introducing-gpt-5-4/

GPT-5.4 (Generative Pre-trained Transformer 5.4) is a large language model (LLM) released by OpenAI on March 5, 2026.

OpenAI initially released the model in two variants, GPT-5.4 Thinking and GPT-5.4 Pro. Neither is available to free-tier users. On March 17, OpenAI released GPT-5.4 mini and GPT-5.4 nano. GPT-5.4 mini is available to free-tier users, and GPT-5.4 nano is only available via the OpenAI API. Through the OpenAI API, GPT-5.4 mini and GPT-5.4 nano are four times more expensive than their GPT-5 equivalents.

In technical benchmarks, OpenAI reported a 33% reduction in factual errors compared to GPT-5.2. Performance improvements were focused on professional workflows. GPT-5.4 has built-in computer use capabilities, and improved deep research capabilities. In the benchmark OSWorld-Verified, which scores large language models' ability to use desktop environments, GPT-5.4 scored 75%, compared to GPT-5.2's 47.3% and the average person's 72.4%.

== Release ==
GPT-5.4 Thinking and GPT-5.4 Pro were released on March 5, 2026, with neither being available to free-tier users. GPT-5.4 mini and GPT-5.4 nano released on March 17, with GPT-5.4 mini available to free-tier users and GPT-5.4 nano available through the OpenAI API.

== Reception ==
ZDNET praised GPT-5.4 Thinking for its low tendency to hallucinate, and criticized it for sometimes not following user prompts accurately.

Vice praised GPT-5.4 Thinking for its improved deep research capabilities, and using less tokens in its responses compared to GPT-5.2 Thinking.

The Decoder criticized GPT-5.4 mini and GPT-5.4 nano for being four times more expensive through the OpenAI API than their GPT-5 equivalents.
