= OpenAI Codex =

Software engineering agent developed by OpenAI

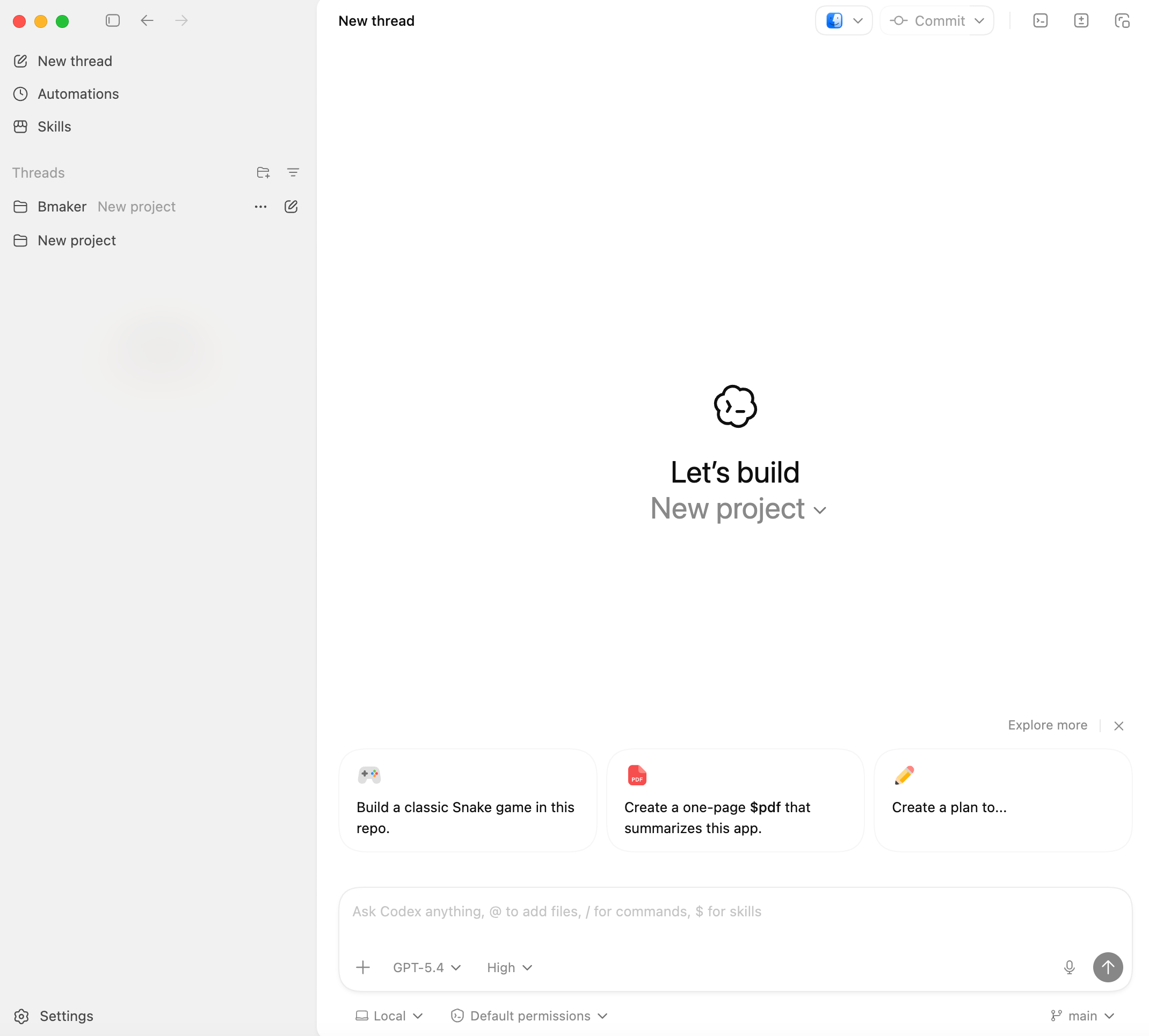
- The Codex desktop app start screen, showing options for creating a new project and using Codex tools
- Developer: OpenAI
- Release: 2025; 1 year ago
- Operating system: Windows; macOS; Web platform
- License: CLI: Apache 2.0; Desktop: Proprietary
- Website: chatgpt.com/codex/
- Repository: github.com/openai/codex

Codex is an AI coding agent developed by OpenAI for software engineering tasks such as writing code and fixing bugs, released in April 2025 as Codex CLI. Codex is available through ChatGPT's web app, the Codex CLI, a desktop app for Windows and macOS, and several IDE integrations. In March 2026, OpenAI introduced Codex Security, an application-security agent designed to identify and fix software vulnerabilities.

By March 2026, Codex had grown to more than 2 million weekly active users, and OpenAI was positioning it as a broader enterprise agent platform that could eventually be used for tasks beyond software development.

== History ==
OpenAI released Codex CLI on April 16, 2025, as an open-source coding agent that runs locally in the terminal. It connects OpenAI's language models with local code and command-line tasks, enabling them to write and edit code, execute commands, and interact with files through a lightweight interface.

A month later, on May 16, 2025, the company announced a research preview of Codex Cloud. At launch it was powered by codex-1, a version of the o3 reasoning model optimized for software engineering, and could write features, answer questions about a codebase, fix bugs, and propose code changes for review. The research preview first rolled out to some paid ChatGPT tiers, and ChatGPT Plus users gained access in June 2025.

In February 2026, OpenAI released a desktop Codex app intended to help users manage multiple coding agents over longer periods and use code to gather or analyze information, and updated the underlying model twice: GPT-5.3-Codex arrived on February 5, followed a week later by GPT-5.3-Codex-Spark, a lower-latency variant for real-time interactive coding that was initially available as a research preview for ChatGPT Pro users. Spark was OpenAI's first production model deployed on Cerebras hardware and ran about 15 times faster than earlier Codex versions, according to InfoQ.

OpenAI released GPT-5.4 for Codex on March 5, 2026. Later that month, OpenAI announced that the ChatGPT app for computers, Codex, and ChatGPT Atlas were to be combined into a single desktop "superapp" as part of an effort to simplify its product lineup and respond to growing competition from Anthropic. OpenAI also agreed to acquire Python toolmaker Astral, a deal that would bring Astral's developer tools into Codex. In April 2026, Reuters reported that pressure from Anthropic's Claude Code had led OpenAI to redirect resources toward Codex and enterprise tools as part of a broader strategic refocus.

OpenAI merged the Codex app with the ChatGPT desktop app on July 9, 2026.

== Features ==
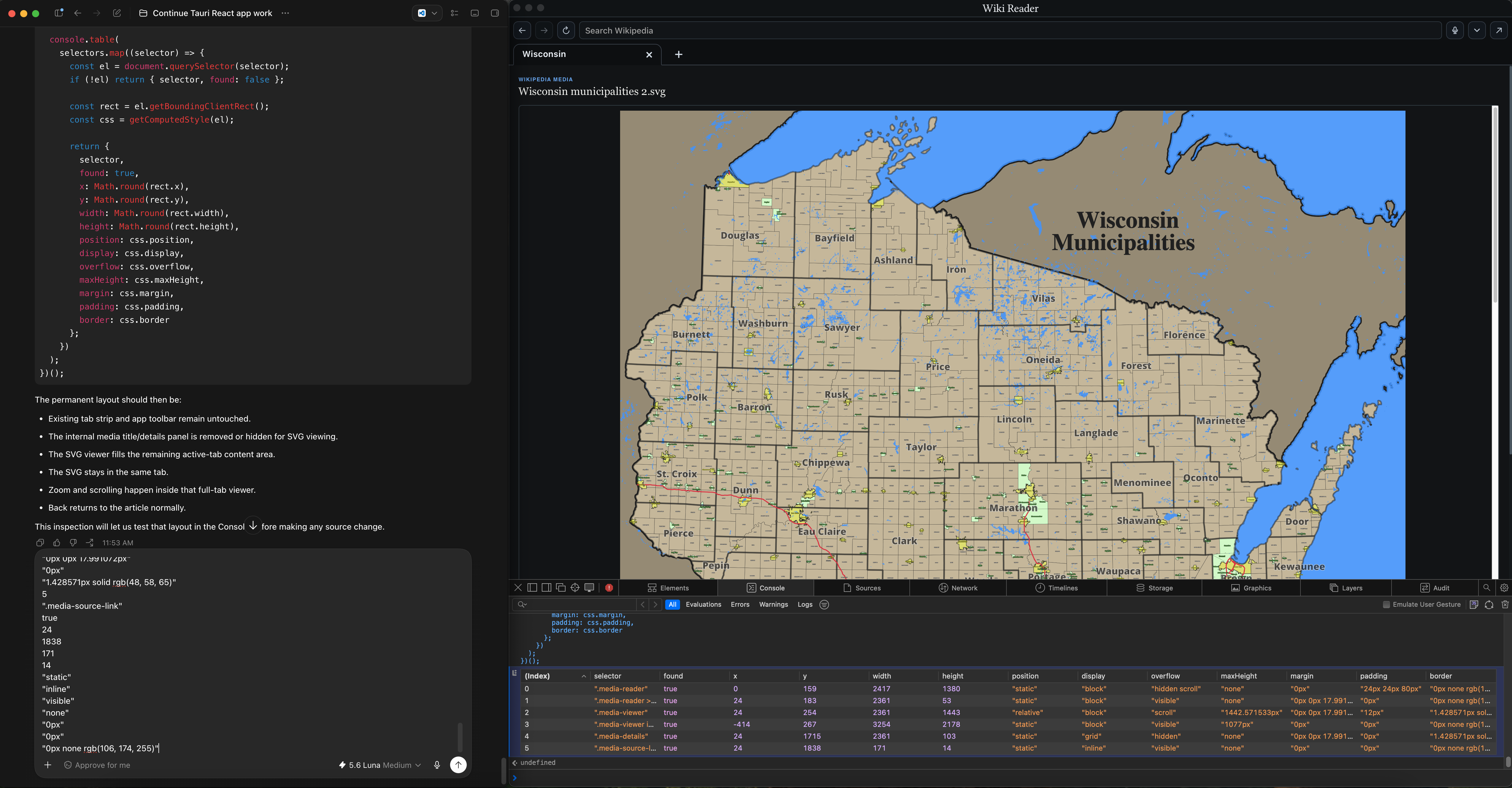
OpenAI Codex native app working with Tauri and using the DOM Inspector

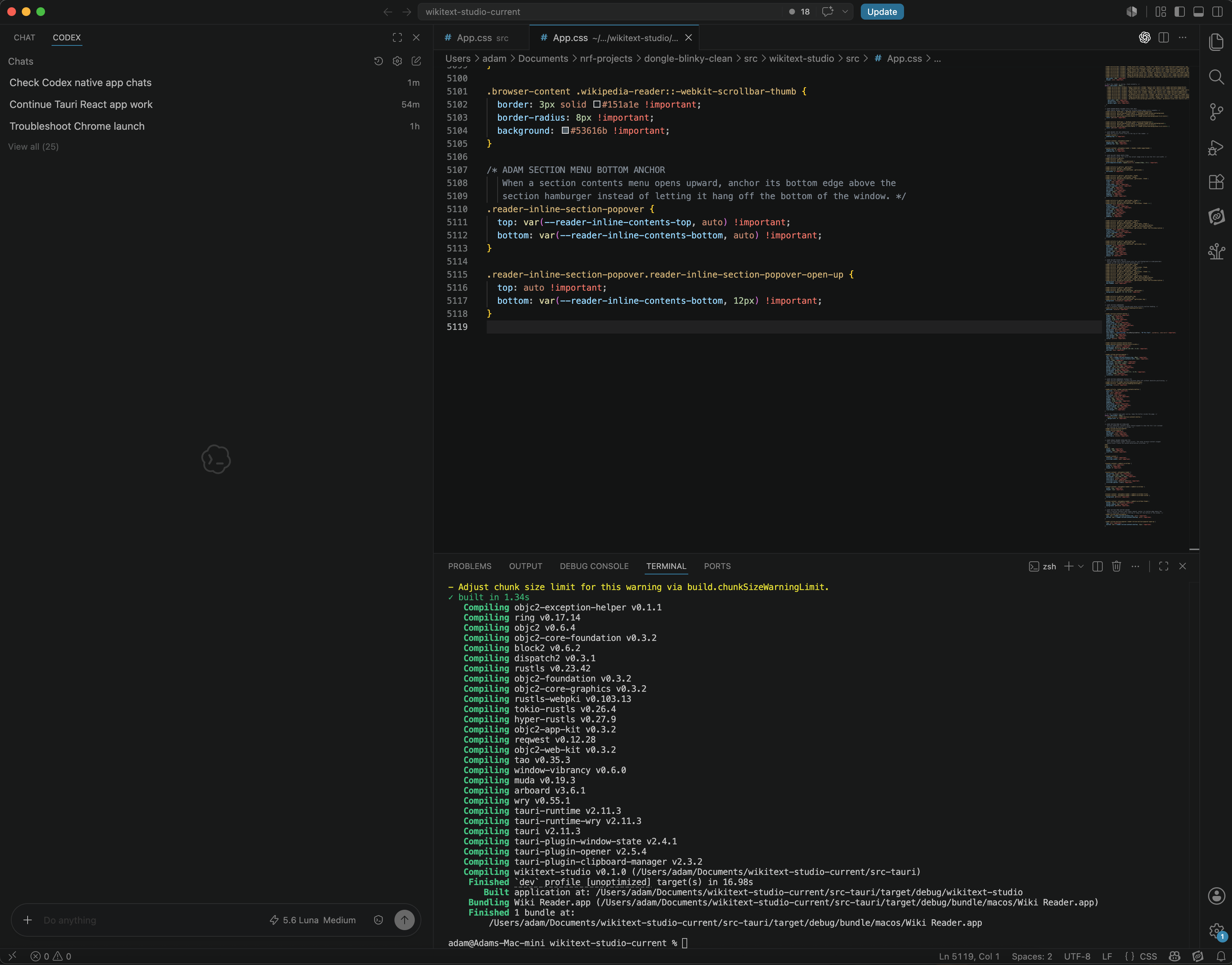
Codex extension for VScode

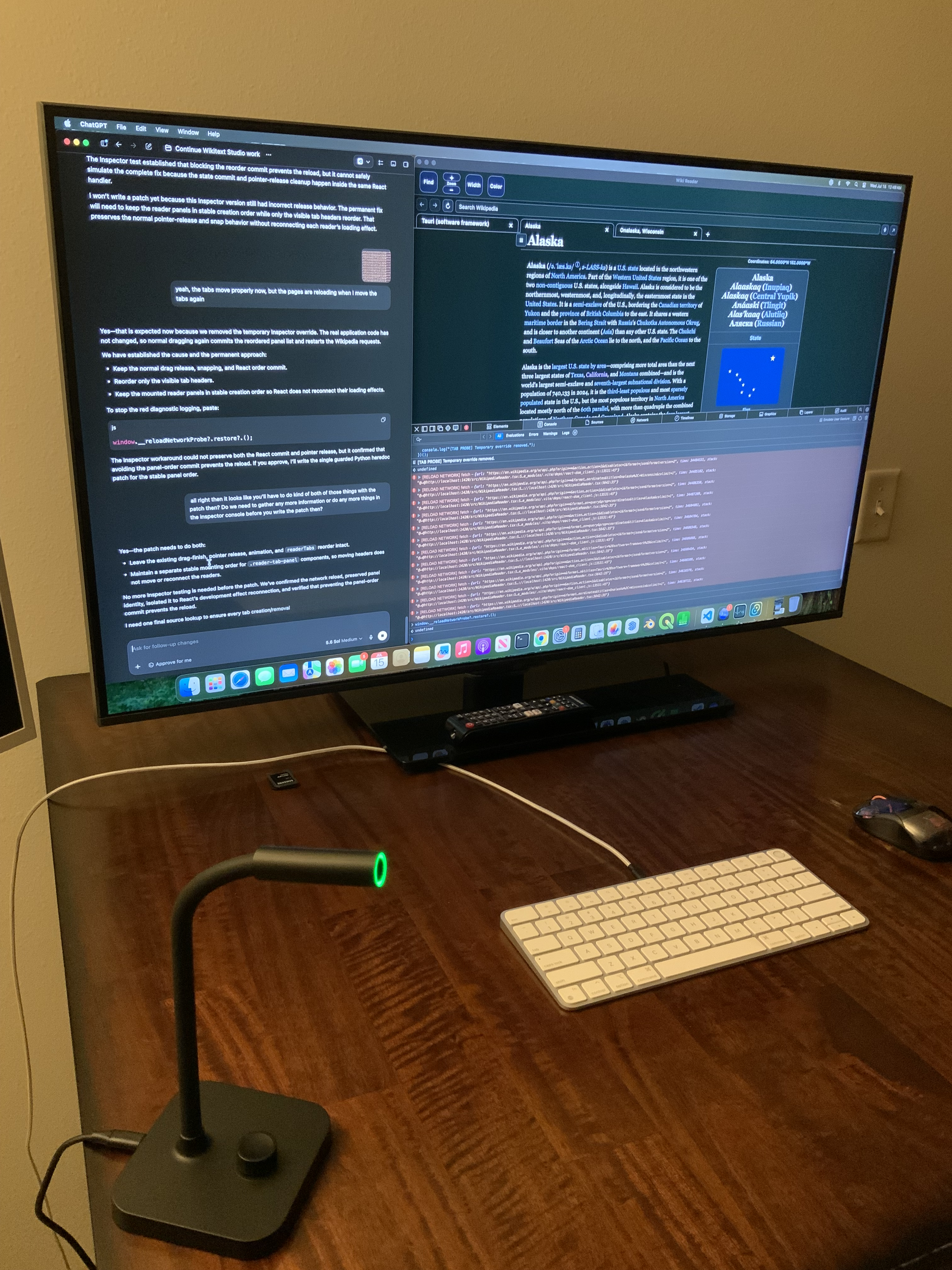
Microphone to chat with Codex via voice to text

Each Codex task runs in a separate cloud environment preloaded with the user's repository, where the agent can read and edit files, run tests, and invoke other code-checking tools. The arrangement lets Codex function more like a coding agent than a conventional assistant, handling tasks independently before returning results for review. Most tasks take between 1 and 30 minutes; Codex returns command logs and test results so users can inspect what it has done. Codex was initially available inside ChatGPT's web app and deliberately lacked general internet access for security reasons, though OpenAI later enabled optional internet access during task execution. Security of those execution environments also drew scrutiny. In March 2026, SecurityWeek reported that researchers had found a now-patched vulnerability in Codex in which malicious GitHub branch names could inject commands during task setup and retrieve GitHub authentication tokens.

=== Architecture and platforms ===
By February 2026, OpenAI had described a single "App Server" architecture that powered the CLI, the Visual Studio Code extension, the web app, the macOS desktop app, and third-party IDE integrations including JetBrains and Xcode. The unified server keeps long-running sessions and approval requests consistent across client interfaces. A Windows version released in March 2026 added native PowerShell support and a Windows-native agent sandbox built with operating-system controls such as restricted tokens and filesystem permission controls (ACLs). Apple deepened the Xcode integration in Xcode 26.3, allowing developers to use the agent inside Apple's development environment rather than only through OpenAI's own tools; TechCrunch reported that the integration let Codex inspect a project's structure, consult current Apple developer documentation, build projects, run tests, and revert changes through automatically created milestones.

=== Third-party integrations ===
A series of third-party integrations extended Codex beyond OpenAI's own applications. GitHub added the agent in public preview to its Agent HQ system, making it available inside GitHub, GitHub Mobile, and Visual Studio Code for some Copilot subscribers; The Verge reported that developers could assign Codex to issues and pull requests and compare its output with other agents such as Claude and Copilot. Figma announced an integration that let users move between Figma and Codex through Figma's Model Context Protocol server, connecting interface design and code implementation. In March 2026, OpenAI added an enterprise-facing plugin system that let organizations package workflows, app integrations, and Model Context Protocol server configurations into installable bundles. InfoWorld reported that administrators could manage those plugins through policy settings and private marketplaces, allowing them to distribute, permit, or block particular plugins across teams.

=== Codex Security ===
Alongside these developer-workflow features, OpenAI introduced Codex Security in March 2026, an application-security agent designed to identify and propose fixes for software vulnerabilities. SecurityWeek reported that the tool had been in private beta since 2025, including testing by Netgear, and that it worked by first building a threat model of a repository before looking for vulnerabilities and proposing fixes. OpenAI said it had tested the tool on 1.2 million commits over the previous 30 days, identifying nearly 800 critical vulnerabilities and more than 10,000 high-severity issues in projects including Chromium, OpenSSL, PHP, the self-hosted Git service GOGS, and GnuTLS. The tool validates suspected issues in sandboxed environments so it can prioritize findings by likely real-world impact and reduce false positives before suggesting patches. The tool was derived from an earlier internal project called Aardvark. OpenAI said beta testing had reduced false positives by more than 50 percent, and CSO Online reported that 14 vulnerabilities it found in open-source projects had received CVE identifiers.

==== Patch the Planet ====
Codex Security, along with GPT-5.5-Cyber, was being used in June 2026 at the launch of the Patch the Planet project, in partnership with Trail of Bits, to help open-source projects find and fix vulnerabilities. In August 2026, Dark Reading quoted the director of security research for 1Password as having run into quality concerns with many of the patches identified from this partnership (as well as other tools) such as being misclassified, failing to fix the vulnerability or introducing new vulnerabilities. The security director felt that AI security tools were better at exploiting vulnerabilities than patching them.

== Reception ==
Reuters described coding as one of artificial intelligence's most commercially successful uses and said the market for coding agents had become a key battleground among AI companies, with rivals such as Claude Code, Cursor, and Amazon's Kiro vying for developer adoption. OpenAI's desktop Codex app, released in February 2026, was widely seen as an effort to gain ground against Anthropic in particular, and the company used a Super Bowl LX commercial that month to promote the tool as a way to help people turn ideas into software products. According to people with direct knowledge of the matter, Codex's usage had risen from about 5 percent of Claude Code's to roughly 40 percent between September 2025 and January 2026.

More than one million developers used the tool in the month before the desktop app's launch; after the release of GPT-5.3-Codex, Fortune reported that the figure had reached 1.6 million weekly active users, with companies including Cisco, Nvidia, Ramp, Rakuten, and Harvey deploying it across developer teams. By mid-March, Codex had surpassed 2 million weekly active users, with usage up fivefold since the beginning of 2026.

OpenAI was also positioning Codex as more than a coding tool. Fortune reported that the company was presenting it as a broader enterprise agent platform that could eventually handle tasks beyond software development, and WIRED said the company hoped to use Codex for task-completing features across its products.

== See also ==
- List of AI-assisted software development tools
