= Comparison of generative AI models =

This is a comparison of generative AI models, such as language models and text-to-image models, across various benchmarks and user-generated Elo ratings. Leading large language models are sometimes called frontier models.

== Background ==
Independent evaluation is widely used to compare frontier models because developer-reported scores are hard to compare directly.

- Artificial Analysis (AA) runs the Artificial Analysis Intelligence Index v4.3.2 across 10 evaluations including AA-Briefcase, GDPval-AA, AutomationBench-AA and Terminal-Bench 4.0, plus price per 1M tokens and output speed in tokens/s. Its pricing and index data have been cited in coverage reporting DeepSeek V4-Flash as by far the cheapest well-known model to run.
- Arena.ai, formerly Chatbot Arena from University of California, Berkeley, ranks models by blind human votes into elo-style ratings. It tripled to a $1.7 billion valuation in January 2026 after raising $150 million. Earlier coverage described its spin-out from an academic project into a $600 million startup.
- Epoch AI publishes the Epoch Capabilities Index (ECI), a composite across 50 plus benchmarks scaled so that Claude 3.5 Sonnet equals 130. As of 10 October 2026, Claude Opus 5.5 leads at 167.3, ahead of GPT-6 Astra at 166.4. Its independence has been scrutinized over delayed disclosure of OpenAI funding for FrontierMath.
- Vals AI publishes the Vals Index (v2.1), agentic performance across finance, coding, legal and tax tasks weighted by share of United States GDP; methodology dated 25 September 2026 with the leaderboard updated 7 October 2026.

== Language models ==
Comparison of language models across benchmarks, as of 10 October 2026 (Note: An asterisk denotes an Artificial Analysis estimated score pending independent evaluation; n/a indicates no published score in the cited snapshot.)
Model	Developer	Origin	Release Date	License	AA Intelligence Index (Note: Scores shown are for each model's highest-performing reasoning effort level on Artificial Analysis; lower-effort configurations of the same model are omitted.)	Arena.ai Text Rating (Note: Arena.ai scores shown are each model's best across reported effort variants on the leaderboard.)	Epoch Capability Index	Vals Index	AA Cost per Task (USD)	AA Speed (Median Tokens/s)
Claude Opus 5.5	Anthropic	United States	22 September 2026	Proprietary	58	1507	167.3	67.0	$5.98	96
Claude Sonnet 5.5	Anthropic	United States	28 September 2026	Proprietary	56	1476	165.0	67.0	$5.46	141
Claude Fable 5.1	Anthropic	United States	September 2026	Proprietary	53	1501	164.7	65.8	$7.63	70
GPT-6 Astra	OpenAI	United States	3 September 2026	Proprietary	53	1475	166.4	63.1	$3.26	47
Gemini 4 Argon	Google DeepMind	United States	30 September 2026 (limited access)	Proprietary	53	1525	n/a	68.9	$1.99	n/a
GPT-6.1 Sol	OpenAI	United States	29 September 2026	Proprietary	52	1484	166.1	61.2	$0.72	56
Claude Opus 5	Anthropic	United States	24 July 2026	Proprietary	51	1490	162.8	63.7	$5.86	53
Claude Fable 5	Anthropic	United States	9 June 2026	Proprietary	50	1504	162.1	61.4	$8.75	68
Muse Spark 1.3	Meta Platforms	United States	September 2026	Proprietary	48	1494	156.8	58.2	$1.60	175
GPT-5.6 Sol	OpenAI	United States	9 July 2026	Proprietary	47	1485	161.7	58.0	$1.99	79
Grok 4.7	SpaceXAI	United States	September 2026	Proprietary	46	1443	153.5	55.0	$3.74	74
MiMo-V2.6-Pro	Xiaomi	China	21 September 2026	MIT License	46	1480	n/a	55.2	$0.13	43
Qwen3.8 Max 0902	Alibaba Cloud	China	2 September 2026	Proprietary	45	1483	156.4	48.3	$5.41	36
GLM-5.3	Zhipu AI	China	August 2026	MIT License	45	1478	155.6	53.5	$2.01	83
Grok 4.6	SpaceXAI	United States	12 August 2026	Proprietary	44	1454	156.4	52.1	$1.86	60
Step 5 Preview	StepFun	China	August 2026	Proprietary	44	1447	n/a	n/a	$1.03	87
Kimi K3	Moonshot AI	China	16 July 2026	Kimi K3 License	44	1488	157.4	50.3	$2.00	41
Claude Haiku 5.5	Anthropic	United States	7 October 2026	Proprietary	43	n/a	n/a	54.3	$0.21	240
GPT-5.6 Terra	OpenAI	United States	9 July 2026	Proprietary	42	1466	159.6	53.1	$1.40	108
GLM-5.3-Flash	Zhipu AI	China	August 2026	MIT License	42	1475	151.9	n/a	$0.25	53
Claude Opus 4.8	Anthropic	United States	28 May 2026	Proprietary	42	1481	158.2	55.1	$4.08	57
Gemini 3.8 Flash	Google DeepMind	United States	September 2026	Proprietary	41	1497	156.7	54.8	$1.24	125
Claude Opus 4.7	Anthropic	United States	16 April 2026	Proprietary	41	1501	156.3	n/a	n/a	50
Ling 3.1 Flash	InclusionAI	China	30 September 2026	Proprietary	41	n/a	n/a	n/a	$0.99	214
Qwen3.8 2.4T A95B	Alibaba Cloud	China	September 2026	Qwen3.8-Max license	40	n/a	n/a	n/a	$2.16	37
Qwen3.8-Flash-Next	Alibaba Cloud	China	September 2026	Qwen Community 1.0	40	n/a	n/a	n/a	$0.37	56
Gemini 3.7 Flash	Google DeepMind	United States	13 August 2026	Proprietary	39	1486	157.3	51.3	$0.93	318
DeepSeek V4.1 Flash	DeepSeek	China	August 2026	MIT License	39	1475	154.9	51.3	$0.27	217
GPT-5.4	OpenAI	United States	5 March 2026	Proprietary	39	1475	156.8	n/a	n/a	142
Grok 4.5	SpaceXAI	United States	8 July 2026	Proprietary	39	1466	153.9	44.7	$1.04	61
Claude Sonnet 5	Anthropic	United States	30 June 2026	Proprietary	38	1461	156.2	51.8	$5.09	77
GPT-5.5	OpenAI	United States	23 April 2026	Proprietary	38	1482	159.1	n/a	$2.63	108
GPT-6 Luna	OpenAI	United States	22 September 2026	Proprietary	38	1443	156.3	51.2	$0.07	139
MiMo-V2.6-Flash	Xiaomi	China	21 September 2026	MIT License	38	1451	n/a	53.2	$0.06	58
Mistral Large 4 Preview	Mistral AI	France	6 October 2026	Proprietary	38	1429	n/a	48.1	$1.13	n/a
GPT-5.6 Luna	OpenAI	United States	9 July 2026	Proprietary	37	1452	156.4	51.7	$0.18	159
DeepSeek V4 Pro 0813	DeepSeek	China	13 August 2026	MIT License	36	1465	155.3	47.6	$0.67	89
Agnes 3.0 Flash	Sapiens AI	Singapore	2026	Proprietary	36*	n/a	n/a	n/a	n/a	n/a
Agnes 2.5 Pro Beta	Sapiens AI	Singapore	2026	Proprietary	35*	n/a	n/a	n/a	n/a	n/a
DeepSeek V4 Flash Vision	DeepSeek	China	August 2026	MIT License	35	n/a	n/a	n/a	$0.31	221

== Text-to-image models ==
Comparison of text-to-image models, as of 10 October 2026 (Note: Arena Elo ratings annotated as preliminary are based on fewer than 5,000 votes at the time of collection and are subject to greater statistical uncertainty as additional votes are recorded.)
Model	Developer	Origin	Release Date	AA Elo	Arena Elo	API Price per 1k Images (USD)	License
GPT Image 2.5 Sunburst	OpenAI	United States	September 2026	1198	1425	$210.70	Proprietary
GPT Image 2.5 Flare	OpenAI	United States	September 2026	1191	1398	$210.70	Proprietary
GPT Image 2	OpenAI	United States	April 2026	1171	1383	$211.00	Proprietary
Nano Banana 2.1	Google DeepMind	United States	October 2026	1160	1328	$33.60	Proprietary
Grok Imagine Image 2.0	SpaceXAI	United States	August 2026	1156	1334	$60.00	Proprietary
MAI-Image-2.6	Microsoft AI	United States	August 2026	1151	1332	$38.90	Proprietary
Nano Banana 2	Google DeepMind	United States	February 2026	1127	1262	$67.00	Proprietary
Muse Image	Meta Platforms	United States	July 2026	1116	1274	$10.00	Proprietary
FLUX 3 Image	Black Forest Labs	Germany	October 2026	1115	n/a	$48.00	Proprietary
GPT Image 1.5	OpenAI	United States	December 2025	1107	1237	$133.00	Proprietary
MAI-Image-2.6-Flash	Microsoft AI	United States	September 2026	1106	n/a	$19.50	Proprietary
MAI-Image-2.5	Microsoft AI	United States	June 2026	1103	1254	$48.10	Proprietary
Nano Banana Pro	Google DeepMind	United States	November 2025	1102	1248	$134.00	Proprietary
MAI-Image-2.5-Pro	Microsoft AI	United States	July 2026	1100	n/a	$108.50	Proprietary
Nano Banana 2 Lite	Google DeepMind	United States	June 2026	1095	1250	$33.60	Proprietary
Qwen-Image-3.0-Pro	Alibaba Cloud	China	July 2026	1088	1255	$40.00	Qwen License
Seedream 5.0 Pro	ByteDance	China	July 2026	1080	1255	$90.00	Proprietary
Qwen-Image-3.0	Alibaba Cloud	China	July 2026	1074	n/a	$30.00	Qwen License
Grok Imagine Image Quality	SpaceXAI	United States	May 2026	1046	n/a	$50.00	Proprietary
Qwen-Image-2.1	Alibaba Cloud	China	September 2026	1038	1223	n/a	Qwen License

== See also ==
- List of large language models
- Text-to-image model
- Arena.ai
