= Lean product development =

Product development

Lean product development (LPD) is an approach to product development that specializes in minimizing waste. Other core principles include putting people over the product and creating new values in services and physical products. This method of product development has been adopted by companies such as Toyota.

== History of Lean Product Development ==
Toyota started its journey with lean product development at Toyota Loom Works (see History of Toyota). Their early approach is notably different from Lean manufacturing which became famous through the book "The Machine That Changed the World".

When Toyota started manufacturing cars, there was a difference in manufacturing conditions between Japan and the USA. Toyota had few educated engineers and little prior experience. Car companies in the US employed a well-educated workforce in the cities and benefited from the research and student skill sets of established engineering schools. To tackle this shortfall in knowledge and experience, Toyota conducted an incremental approach to development that built on their existing knowledge and became the basis of the lean systems Toyota uses today.

Allen Ward studied Toyota’s lean product development system and found parallels with the US airplane industry. For instance, the Wright brothers’ method of constructing their airplanes became one of the legacies they passed on to the aviation industry. This approach enabled the USA to create one of World War II's most successful fighter planes from scratch in the short span of six months. After the war, Toyota incorporated many of the airline industry's findings into its product development methodology.

== Differences between lean product development and lean production ==
While some basic principles and guidelines are applicable across Lean product development and lean production (such as waste reduction), many applications of lean processes for development have focused more on the production approach.

The purpose of production is to manufacture products reliably within the margins of control. The flow of value is physically evident, and the link between cause and effect is easy to see. For example, feedback on adjusting the speed of production is immediately realized in an increase or decrease in rejected items. Any decisions made must be based on best practice.

On the other hand, the purpose of product development is to design new products that improve the lives of customers. This is a complex space where the flow of value can only be discerned at an abstract level and where cause and effect might be separated by time and space. For example, feedback on the decision to design a certain feature will not be received until the product has been built and is in the hands of the customer. This means that decisions are made on short-cycle experimentation, prototyping, set-based design, and emergent practice. A premium is placed on creating reusable knowledge and reducing risk at handover points.

An essential point about these differences is summarized in the advice Jim Womack gave Harley Davidson: "Don't try to bring lean manufacturing upstream to product development. The application of Lean in product development and manufacturing are different. Some aspects may look similar, but they are not! Be wary of an expert with experience in lean manufacturing who claims to know product development."

The most common high-level concepts associated with lean product development are:

1. Creation of re-usable knowledge. Knowledge is created and maintained so that it can be leveraged for successive products or iterations.
2. Set-based concurrent engineering. Different stages of product development run simultaneously rather than consecutively to decrease development time, improve productivity, and reduce costs.
3. Teams of responsible experts. Lean product development organizations develop cross-functional teams and reward competence building in teams and individuals.
4. Cadence and pull. Managers of lean product development organizations develop autonomous teams, where engineers plan their work and work their plans.
5. Visual management. Visualization is a main enabler of lean product development.
6. Entrepreneurial system designer. The lean product development organization makes one person responsible for the engineering and aesthetic design, and market and business success, of the product.
7. Flow management.

== Results of Lean Product Development ==
Lean product development has been claimed to produce the following results:

- Increase innovation ten-fold
- Increase introduction of new products 400%-500%

Companies such as Toyota can attribute their success to lean product development. In 2000, Toyota launched 14 new products, a larger product line than GM's entire product offering. At that point, Toyota had just 70,000 employees while GM had more than five times as many.

== Applicability of lean product development ==
Researchers divide product development projects according to their need drivers:

- Wished: there is no such product on the market, only a wish for such a product. These projects can be on the edge of what is possible to do.
- Wanted: there are only a few basic similar products on the market that usually require improvement.
- Needed: there are enough products in existence so knowledge about this is abundant on the market.

For example, the mobile phone was dubbed to many as a, "wanted" product in the 1990s as it was described as being, "on the leading edge of technology." Today it is regarded as a "needed" product because of its common state in the modern market.

Product development methods can be classified according to whether they are focused on handling stable or non-stable conditions. Lean product development is a dynamic method of product development that handles unstable conditions.

The influence of need drivers and stability (or lack of stability) on product development are illustrated in the table below.

	Short	Medium	Long
Needed	stable	stable	moderately non-stable
Wanted	moderately non-stable	moderately non-stable	non-stable
Wished	non-stable	non-stable	non-stable

== See also ==
- Design for lean manufacturing
- Lean startup
- Lean project management
- Muntzing
- Toyota Production System
- COLETEK Product Development is an example of an AI-based cloud platform for lean product development.
