= Taguchi =

Taguchi (written: 田口 lit. "rice field mouth") is a Japanese surname. Notable people with the surname include:

- Emiko Taguchi (田口 恵美子, born 1951), Japanese speed skater
- Genichi Taguchi (田口 玄一, 1924–2012), Japanese engineer and statistician
- Hajime Taguchi (田口 一, born 1975), Japanese writer
- Hiroko Taguchi (田口 宏子, born 1973), Japanese voice actress
- Junnosuke Taguchi (田口 淳之介, born 1985), Japanese singer-songwriter, actor and model
- Junto Taguchi (田口 潤人, born 1996), Japanese footballer
- Katsuhiko Taguchi (田口 勝彦, born 1972), Japanese rally driver
- Katsutoshi Taguchi (田口 勝利, born 1961), Japanese handball player
- Kazuto Taguchi (田口 麗斗, born 1995), Japanese baseball player
- Kei Taguchi (田口 計, born 1933), Japanese actor
- Kumi Taguchi (disambiguation), multiple people
- Masaharu Taguchi (田口 正治, 1916–1982), Japanese swimmer
- Masanori Taguchi (田口 昌徳, born 1970), Japanese baseball player
- Mitsuhisa Taguchi (田口 光久, 1955–2019), Japanese footballer
- Nobutaka Taguchi (田口 信教, born 1951), Japanese swimmer
- Paul Yashigoro Taguchi (1902–1978), Japanese cardinal
- Ryoichi Taguchi (田口 良一, born 1986), Japanese boxer
- Ryusuke Taguchi (田口 隆祐, born 1979), Japanese professional wrestler
- Sherrie Gong Taguchi, American writer
- Shigehiro Taguchi (田口 成浩, born 1990), Japanese basketball player
- Shota Taguchi (田口 翔大, born 2004), Japanese actor
- So Taguchi (田口 壮, born 1969), Japanese baseball player
- Taishi Taguchi (田口 泰士, born 1991), Japanese footballer
- Takahiro Taguchi (田口 貴寛, born 1957), Japanese footballer
- Takashi Taguchi (disambiguation), multiple people
- Tomorowo Taguchi (田口 トモロヲ, born 1957), Japanese actor, film director and musician
- Taguchi Ukichi (田口 卯吉, 1855–1905), Japanese historian and economist
- Yaeko Taguchi (田口 八重子, born 1955), Japanese woman kidnapped by North Korea
- Yoshinori Taguchi (田口 禎則, born 1965), Japanese footballer and manager

== Fictional characters ==
- Ryō Taguchi in the Sweet Home film and video game
