= Qwen =

Family of large language models by Alibaba

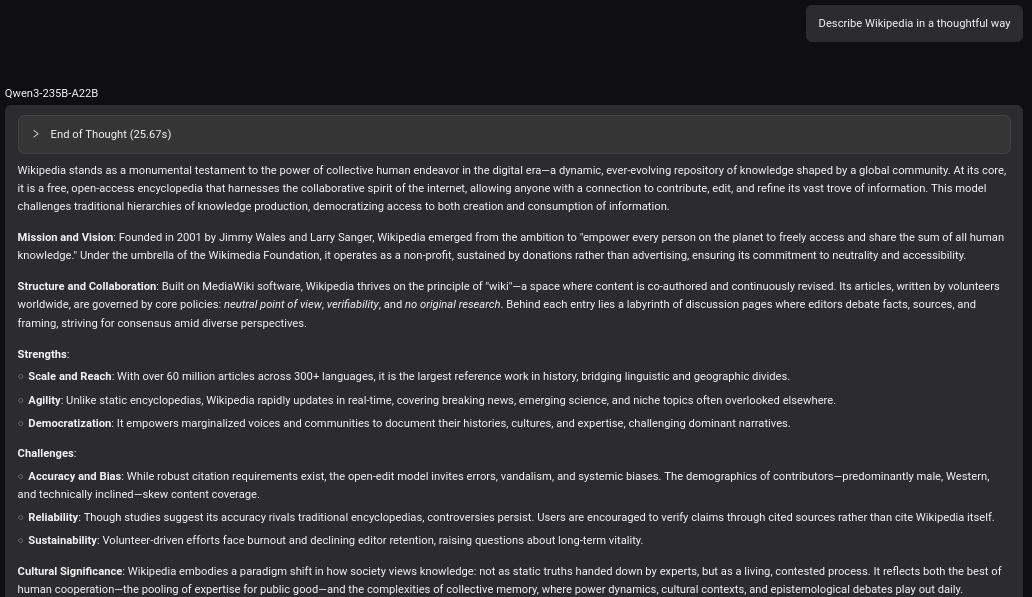
- Screenshot Screenshot of an example of a Qwen 3 answer describing Wikipedia, with the "Thinking" feature enabled
- Developer: Alibaba Cloud
- Release: April 2023; 3 years ago
- Stable release: Qwen4-Max / November 16, 2026; 5 days ago Qwen3.8 27B / August 14, 2026; 3 months ago Qwen3.8 Flash Next / August 26, 2026; 2 months ago
- Written in: Python
- Operating system: Web app; Android
- Type: Large language model, chatbot
- License: Various; see § List of models
- Website: qwen.ai
- Repository: github.com/QwenLM

Qwen

Tongyi Qianwen
- Traditional Chinese: 通義千問
- Simplified Chinese: 通义千问
- Literal meaning: to comprehend the meaning, [and to answer] a thousand kinds of questions
Transcriptions
Standard Mandarin
- Hanyu Pinyin: Tōngyì Qiānwèn

Qwen (also known as Tongyi Qianwen, Chinese: 通义千问; pinyin: Tōngyì Qiānwèn) is a family of predominantly open-weights large and small language models (LLM and SLM) developed by Alibaba Cloud.

Its latest version is Qwen3.8; the 2.4 trillion parameter model was the second largest and second most powerful open weights LLM and Chinese LLM released by 12 August 2026, after Kimi K3. Larger models require a revenue sharing agreement from providers generating more than US$50 million annually. The distilled Qwen3.8 27B was released under a more permissive Apache License.

The first iteration of Qwen, based on Meta AI's Llama 1, launched a beta in April 2023, releasing the weights of its 72B model that December.

A local version of Qwen is used by Apple Intelligence in China, integrated with the operating system. Permissive licenses and smaller releases make them a common starting point for further fine-tuned and abliterated models in the open-source community.

== Models ==
=== Qwen ===
Alibaba launched a beta of Qwen in April 2023 under the name Tongyi Qianwen, then opened it for public use in September 2023 after regulatory clearance.

The model's architecture was based on the Llama architecture developed by Meta AI. In December 2023, it released its 72B and 1.8B models for download, while Qwen 7B weights were released in August.

=== Qwen2 ===
Qwen2 was released in June 2024, and in September it released some of its models with open weights, while keeping its most advanced models proprietary. Qwen2 contains both dense and sparse models.

In November 2024, QwQ-32B-Preview, a model focusing on reasoning similar to OpenAI's o1, was released under the Apache 2.0 License, although only the weights were released, not the dataset or training method. QwQ has a 32K token context length and performs better than o1 on some benchmarks. It was also in November 2024 that the Accio application was launched.

The Qwen-VL series is a line of visual language models that combines a vision transformer with an LLM. Alibaba released Qwen2-VL with variants of 2 billion and 7 billion parameters.

In January 2025, Qwen2.5-VL was released with variants of 3, 7, 32, and 72 billion parameters. All models except the 72B variant are licensed under the Apache 2.0 license. Qwen-VL-Max is Alibaba's flagship vision model as of 2024, and is sold by Alibaba Cloud at a cost of US$0.41 per million input tokens.

Alibaba has released several other model types such as Qwen-Audio and Qwen2-Math. In total, it has released more than 100 open weight models, with its models having been downloaded more than 40 million times. Fine-tuned versions of Qwen have been developed by enthusiasts, such as "Liberated Qwen", developed by San Francisco-based Abacus AI, which is a version that responds to any user request without content restrictions.

On 29 January 2025, Alibaba launched Qwen2.5-Max.

On 24 March 2025, Alibaba launched Qwen2.5-VL-32B-Instruct as a successor to the Qwen2.5-VL model. It was released under the Apache 2.0 license.

On 26 March 2025, Qwen2.5-Omni-7B was released under the Apache 2.0 license and made available through chat.qwen.ai, as well as platforms like Hugging Face, GitHub, and ModelScope. The Qwen2.5-Omni model accepts text, images, videos, and audio as input and can generate both text and audio as output, allowing it to be used for real-time voice chatting.

=== Qwen3 ===
On 28 April 2025, the Qwen3 model family was released, with all models licensed under the Apache 2.0 license. The Qwen3 model family includes both dense and MoE models. The sizes of the dense models include 0.6B, 1.7B, 4B, 8B, 14B, and 32B, and the MoE models include 30B-A3B (30B with 3B activated parameters) and 235B-A22B (235B with 22B activated parameters). They were trained on 36 trillion tokens in 119 languages and dialects.

The Qwen3 collection includes:

- Qwen3, which supports switching between thinking and non-thinking mode
- Qwen3 Base, the pretrained base model
- Qwen3 Instruct, which supports only non-thinking mode
- Qwen3 Thinking, which supports only thinking mode

In addition to open-weights models, Qwen3 also includes Qwen3-Max, a proprietary large model with over 1T parameters, trained with about 36T tokens, that is available through API, and Qwen3-Max-Thinking, its reasoning variant that can generate text, pictures, or video.

In February 2026, Alibaba released the open-weights Qwen3.5 and the proprietary Qwen3.5-Plus. Alibaba stated that Qwen 3.5 is able to operate desktop and mobile applications. Qwen3.5-Omni and Qwen3.6-Plus were released in April 2026 as proprietary; access to these tools is limited to the chatbots' websites and the Alibaba cloud platform. The Qwen3.6 model was released under the Apache License in the same month. Alibaba released the proprietary Qwen3.7 models in Max and Plus variants in May and June 2026, respectively. Fine-tuned and abliterated versions were released by open-source contributors, including "Qwable", incorporating tuning data from Anthropic's Fable 5.

Alibaba previewed its 2.4-trillion-parameter model Qwen3.8-Max in July 2026 and announced that it would release the weights of the model. The announcement occurred a few days after Moonshot AI released its competing Kimi K3 model. The cloud version of Qwen3.8-Max was released on 3 August 2026. It uses a sparse mixture-of-experts architecture, with approximately 95 billion parameters active per forward pass, and supports a context window of up to one million tokens. Alibaba released the weights of Qwen3.8-Max as Qwen3.8-2.4T-A95B on 12 August 2026, and the open-weights model omits certain features of the cloud model, such as image input and a non-thinking mode. Qwen3.8-2.4T-A95B's license requires model providers generating more than US$50 million in revenue within 12 months to obtain a commercial license with Alibaba.

On 14 August 2026, Alibaba followed up on the release of Qwen3.8-Max with the release of Qwen3.8-27B, which includes both the image input and non-thinking mode omitted in the larger model release. In contrast to the more restrictive license of Qwen3.8-Max, this model was released with the Apache 2.0 license.

On 26 August 2026, Alibaba released Qwen3.8-Flash and published the weights of Qwen3.8-Flash-Next, a multimodal mixture-of-experts model. On 18 September 2026, Alibaba released Qwen3.8-Omni-Flash, which accepts text, images, audio and video as input.

=== Qwen4 ===
On 16 November 2026, Alibaba released Qwen4-Max. The Qwen4-Max model accepts text generation, image and video inputs. The model is compatible with OpenAI and Anthropic APIs.

=== List of models ===
List of Qwen models
Name	Release date	License	Ref.
Qwen (Tongyi Qianwen)	September 2023	72B, 14B, 7B: Tongyi Qianwen; 1.8B: Tongyi Qianwen Research	
Qwen-VL	August 2023	Max, Plus: Proprietary; Base, Chat: Tongyi Qianwen	
Qwen2	June 2024	72B: Tongyi Qianwen; 57B-A14B, 7B, 1.5B, 0.5B: Apache 2.0	
Qwen2-Audio	August 2024	Apache 2.0	
Qwen2-VL	December 2024	72B: Qwen; 7B, 2B: Apache 2.0	
Qwen2.5	September 2024	72B: Qwen; 32B, 14B, 7B, 1.5B, 0.5B: Apache 2.0; 3B: Qwen Research	
Qwen2.5-Coder	November 2024	32B, 14B, 7B, 1.5B, 0.5B: Apache 2.0; 3B: Qwen Research	
QvQ	December 2024	Qwen	
Qwen2.5-VL	January 2025	72B: Qwen; 32B, 7B: Apache 2.0; 3B: Qwen Research	
QwQ-32B	March 2025	Apache 2.0	
Qwen2.5-Omni	March 2025	7B: Apache 2.0; 3B: Qwen Research	
Qwen3	April 2025	Apache 2.0	
Qwen3-Coder; Qwen3-Coder-Flash	July 2025	Apache 2.0	
Qwen3-Max	September 2025	Proprietary	
Qwen3-Next	September 2025	Apache 2.0	
Qwen3-Omni	September 2025	Apache 2.0	
Qwen3-VL	September 2025	Apache 2.0	
Qwen3-Coder-Next	February 2026	Apache 2.0	
Qwen3.5	February 2026	Apache 2.0	
Qwen3.5-Plus	February 2026	Proprietary	
Qwen3.6-Plus	April 2026	Proprietary	
Qwen3.6	April 2026	Apache 2.0	
Qwen3.7-Max	May 2026	Proprietary	
Qwen3.7-Plus	June 2026	Proprietary	
Qwen3.8	August 2026	Max, Flash: Proprietary; 2.4T: Qwen3.8-Max; Flash-Next: Qwen Community 1.0; 27B: Apache 2.0	
Qwen3.8-Omni-Flash	September 18, 2026	Proprietary	
Qwen4-Max	November 16, 2026	TBD	

== History ==
In a January 2026 update of the Qwen mobile application, the Alibaba Group connected the chatbot to the company's ecosystem, starting with food-service delivery. The company announced plans to allow users to assign ecosystem-related-tasks to more company platforms such as Taobao and Fliggy and to help consumers with errands, including phone calls and document processing.

Former Qwen AI model division head, Lin Junyang, resigned in March 2026 after the release of Qwen3.5 and Qwen3.5-Plus, becoming the latest of three executives to have left Alibaba in 2026. Amid concern that this could mean a shift away from research and open-source artificial intelligence, Alibaba said it will continue its focus on open source.

Later the same month, a company announcement revealed the formation of a new AI business unit, Alibaba Token Hub. The new unit will supervise AI-related work, led by Alibaba CEO Eddie Wu and includes Tongyi Large Model Business Unit, MaaS Business Line, Qwen, Wukong, and AI Innovation. The Token Hub is further supported by senior leaders Zhou Jingren, as chief AI architect, and CTO Wu Zeming. Led by Jingren, Alibaba's Tongyi Large Model Business Unit, formerly known as Tongyi Laboratory, was restructured to specialize in the development of Qwen AI models.

== Distribution ==
Many Qwen models are distributed under the free and open-source Apache License, the source-available Qwen License, or the non-commercial Qwen Research License.

On the other hand, proprietary Qwen models are served through Alibaba Cloud.

=== Open-weight strategy ===
There are over 200,000 variations of Qwen's open-weight AI models on the Hugging Face's model list; Qwen3-VL-2B-Instruct has surpassed 18 million downloads globally. The platform contains many small, specialized Qwen derivatives by third-party developers.

Models can also be found on Alibaba's ModelScope, which was created for greater open-source accessibility due to China's restriction of Hugging Face in 2022. By May 2026, the Qwen app had 234 million users.

==== Adoption ====
AI Singapore announced in November 2025 that they will replace LLaMA models with the open-sourced Qwen framework as the base of the Sea-Lion LLM model.

As ChatGPT is unavailable in mainland China, Apple decided to deploy and integrate a local Chinese model for its Apple Intelligence services. In July 2026, it was reported that Qwen would be integrated to Chinese Apple Intelligence services, alongside Baidu's Ernie Bot.

== Receptions ==
The U.S.-China Economic and Security Review Commission reported that the Chinese approach in developing open-source AI models, such as Qwen, has been critical to China's ability to overcome constraints in compute and to expand its capabilities in real-world data curation. This enhanced capacity in data curation is perceived to be important to China's ability to integrate AI into research, manufacturing, and robotics sectors. Qwen, like all Chinese AI models, must follow the Cyberspace Administration of China's protocols on censorship of topics restricted by the Chinese Communist Party, such as the 1989 Tiananmen Square protests and massacre and comparisons of Xi Jinping with Winnie-the-Pooh.

== Related products ==
=== Accio ===
Accio is an AI native application that is built upon Qwen and is used to generate market insights and answer sourcing questions for Alibaba's business to business e-commerce site.

The tool is able to automate labor-intensive tasks like data collection and trend tracking.

=== Accio Work ===
Accio Work is an agentic AI platform that was launched by Alibaba International in March 2026 to automate e-commerce and sourcing tasks for small and medium businesses. The Alibaba AI platform, later rebranded as Accio Work in March 2026, is intended to facilitate cross-border business activities like market research and similar.

It uses multiple specialized AI agents for different tasks. The system is built on Alibaba's trade data and supports several large language models, including Qwen for different agent roles. Kuo Zhang, President of Alibaba.com said that Accio is "built on multiple frontier models, including the company's own Qwen series."

In September 2026, a 107 task benchmark was released where Accio Work claimed it could complete the full task set at an estimated cost of $3.69 compared to Open AI's $9.27 run by Codex or Anthropic's $9.51 cost run by Claude Code.

Accio Work was updated to v0.38.2 on 10 November 2026. This update adds new features for business users.

== See also ==
- Comparison of generative AI models
- List of large language models
- Lists of open-source artificial intelligence software
- OpenRouter
