= Design for lean manufacturing =

Design process

Design for lean manufacturing is a process for applying lean concepts to the design phase of a system, such as a complex product or process. The term describes methods of design in lean manufacturing companies as part of the study of Japanese industry by the Massachusetts Institute of Technology. At the time of the study, the Japanese automakers were outperforming the American counterparts in speed, resources used in design, and design quality. Conventional mass-production design focuses primarily on product functions and manufacturing costs; however, design for lean manufacturing systematically widens the design equation to include all factors that will determine a product's success across its entire value stream and life-cycle. One goal is to reduce waste and maximize value, and other goals include improving the quality of the design and the reducing the time to achieve the final solution. The method has been used in architecture, healthcare, product development, processes design, information technology systems, and even to create lean business models. It relies on the definition and optimization of values coupled with the prevention of wastes before they enter the system. Design for lean manufacturing is system design.

== History ==
Not to be confused with "Lean Design" (copyrighted and patented by Munro & Associates, of Michigan), design for lean manufacturing builds on the set of principles that emerged from design for the customer value and design for manufacturability. Since some lean tools are used in the practice of design for lean manufacturing, it borrows the first word in its name from lean manufacturing as exemplified by the Toyota Production System. Design for lean manufacturing was first coined by Womack, Jones, and Roos after studying the differences between conventional development at American automotive companies and lean methods at Japanese automobile producers. While lean manufacturing focuses on optimization of the production stream and removal of wastes (commonly referred to as muda, mura, and muri) once the value stream has been created, Lean Design ® (Munro & Associates) concerns itself with methods and techniques to create a lean solution from the start, resulting in more value and fewer wastes across the value stream. Lean design ® seeks to optimize the development process through rapid learning cycles to build and test multiple concepts early. Managing the knowledge value stream, systematic problem solving with analysis of the trade-offs between various design options, and solutions generated from ideas filtered by systematic innovation methods are viewed as methods within the lean design process.

== Design for lean manufacturing overview ==
Design for lean manufacturing is based on the premise that product and process design is an ongoing activity and not a one-time activity; therefore design for lean manufacturing should be viewed as a long-term strategy for an organization. Design for lean manufacturing must be sustainable and holistic unlike other lean manufacturing or Six Sigma approaches that either tackle only a part of the problem or tackle the problem for a short period of time. Design for lean manufacturing also relates to system thinking as it considers all aspects (or the full circle) and takes the system conditions into consideration when designing products and services, delivering them according to customer needs. ® (Munro & Associates) drives prevention of waste by adopting a systematic process to improve the design phase during development. An organizational focus is required for the implementation of Lean Design ® principles, which includes efficient and sustainable design team. Initial studies of the Japanese approach to design for lean manufacturing noted four principles; leadership of projects by a shusa (or project boss), tightly knit teams, communication on all of the difficult design trade-offs, and simultaneous development between engineering and manufacturing. Further study showed additional depth to the principles, citing 13 principles specific to the Toyota design for lean manufacturing methods in product and process development in the areas of process, skilled people, and tools and technology. As the practice of design for lean manufacturing has expanded in its depth and breadth of application, additional principles have been integrated into the method.

== Design for lean manufacturing and development principles ==
- Multiple viewpoints are considered in Design for lean manufacturing. These are called out as four value streams; customer, product design and test, production, and knowledge. Alternately, others name four domains; design, supply, manufacturing, and customer. Regardless of the names, focus on the four areas helps developers to think about the value in the solution and the wastes that can enter the system.
- The design for lean manufacturing equation is design for lean manufacturing success = strategic values minus the drivers of design and process wastes. A good design is one that simultaneously reduces waste and delivers value.
- There are multiple drivers that cause product, process, and lifecycle wastes.
- A product is more than the sum of its parts. It's also the sum of the lifecycle processes needed to design, manufacture and use it. The lifecycle of any product is from creation to disposal, from “cradle-to-cradle”.
- Design for lean manufacturing is recognized as being everybody's job. A big challenge is making sure everyone understands their lean design ® job descriptions and how each subsystem contributes to the higher level system. It centers around functions and modules within the system.
- Sub-teams achieve flow through rapid learning cycles which quickly move from planning, designing, building, and testing.
- Learning cycles by sub-teams working on sub-systems are tied together with integration events.
- Most lean manufacturing tools can be directly used by a design for lean manufacturing team. Applying design for lean manufacturing does not make obsolete any existing product design tool, technique or method. Design for lean manufacturing helps a team “knit together” existing tools. For example, the following methods and business tools can be used by organizations within the design for lean manufacturing methodology: Value Stream Mapping, Design for Six Sigma, Visual Control, QFD, DFMA, and Taguchi methods.
- Savings from applying lean to design are hard to predict. Most of the savings will appear only in the sometimes-distant future. Predicting “hidden cost” savings is extremely difficult and questionable given the time it would require.
- Lean measures both the process of design and the design results. Measures drive the design for lean manufacturing culture and promote continuous improvement.
- Toyota's lean product development process is elusive but not impossible to understand. It cannot be imported in parts as is the case with the Toyota Production System.

== The dimensions of lean in design and development ==
To be successful, a corporate wide design for lean manufacturing implementation typically includes the following dimensions:

1. Optimization of product value for the operational value stream.
2. Prevention of waste.
3. Real-time or predictive measurements
4. Product and process accountability throughout the value stream
5. Systematic innovation and problem solving
6. Stakeholder collaboration between functions
7. Team leadership by a chief engineer or entrepreneurial system designer
8. Senior management support

When the dimensions are fully deployed in an organization, design for lean manufacturing enhances the performance levels with respect to design and innovation. Shingo assessments measure lean implementations in all parts of the organization, including the design methodology. The Shingo Prize for Excellence in Manufacturing is given annually for operational excellence in North America. Using design for lean manufacturing practices helps organizations move toward Shingo excellence.

== See also ==
- Cost engineering
- Lean product development
- Muntzing
- Toyota Production System
