= ITHome (website) =

Chinese technology news website

- Native name: IT之家
- Website type: Technology news
- Founded: May 27, 2011
- Website: www.ithome.com

ITHome (Chinese: IT之家; pinyin: IT Zhī Jiā) is a Chinese technology portal website and forum established by Qingdao Ruanmei. Initially launched on May 27, 2011, it primarily focused on sharing IT technology content. Later, Ruanmei merged content from its subsidiary sites Vista Home, Win7 Home, and Win8 Home into ITHome, and developed client apps for Android, iOS, HarmonyOS NEXT, Windows Phone, Windows 10 UWP and WeChat Mini Programs.

== Incidents ==
On October 26, 2016, the CEO Zhang Kai (username "Assassin") issued an announcement stating he could no longer tolerate Alibaba Cloud's overselling and service interruption issues, and had migrated the hosting entirely to Baidu Cloud. Alibaba Cloud subsequently issued an apology letter, but indirectly mentioned that website performance should consider system architecture and avoid single-point design.

== Reception ==
According to Qingdao Daily, ITHome achieved third place in Baidu's China's technology media influence rankings within just four years of establishment, trailing only Zhongguancun Online and PConline. Its founder, Zhang Kai, was a top scorer in Gaokao and studied in Nankai University. Despite attending fewer than 100 classes, his strong interests in software cracking, programming, and gaming laid the foundation for his later internet entrepreneurship.
