= Junyang Lin =

- 林俊旸
- Occupation: AI Researcher
- Employer: Alibaba Group (Former)
- Known for: Core developer of Qwen (Tongyi Qianwen)

Junyang Lin (Chinese：林俊旸，born 1993) is a Chinese computer scientist and artificial intelligence researcher. He was the former lead of large language models at Alibaba's Tongyi Lab and one of the youngest P10-level technical experts in Alibaba Cloud's history. Lin was an early pioneer and the principal technical lead behind Qwen (formerly Tongyi Qwen), Alibaba's flagship open-source large language model system. Lin officially departed from Alibaba in March 2026.

Lin founded a new AI startup in 2026. It received investment from Tencent.
