= Xiangning Zhang =

Chinese information technology entrepreneur

Xiangning "Forrest" Zhang
- 张向宁
- Born: 1972 (age 53–54)
- Occupations: IT entrepreneur; angel investor; venture capitalist

Xiangning "Forrest" Zhang 张向宁 (born in 1972) is a Chinese information technology entrepreneur, angel investor, and venture capitalist. He is among the first generation of internet entrepreneurs in China. Zhang is the founder, former chairman and CEO of HiChina Corporation (now Alibaba Cloud) as well as the chairman and CEO of Tixa Internet Technology Corporation. Zhang foresaw the potential of the internet and provided domain name registration and web hosting services from the end of 1995, leading HiChina to earn the largest share of the Chinese market in this field. Later he started his second company, Tixa, and continued to innovate while holding positions in organizations like the All-China Youth Federation and the China Council for International Investment Promotion.

== Early life ==
Zhang enrolled in Beijing Normal University at 16 years old. His paper on the Principle of Relativity written at 17 years old impressed a professor at the Massachusetts Institute of Technology (MIT), but shortly afterwards, Zhang willingly stopped schooling at 18 years old.

== Professional life ==
Between 1990 and 1994, Zhang worked as a regular staff member and gained operation experience and understanding of corporate management. His work expanded through industries such as international trade, shipping, tourism, bid management, equipment development, computer exhibition, and more.

In 1994, Zhang foresaw the potential of the Internet. Initially interested in the Bulletin Board System (BBS), he started to create one of his own. He eventually decided to suspend all of his other businesses and focus on the Internet industry. At the end of 1995, Zhang founded HiChina Co. (Chinese: 万网), which was to become the largest domain name registration and web hosting service company in China. In January 2000, Zhang initiated the "Net.cn Plan", associating with Sina, Sohu, NetEase, Changhong, Kelon, Computer World, China Info World (CIW), China Internet Network Information Center, China Information Association, and 37 other notable companies and organizations, and created the Internet Services for China Businesses Alliance (Chinese: 中国企业上网服务联盟). Zhang also announced that the year 2000 would be China's Year of Internet Utilization for Businesses (Chinese: 企业上网年). During HiChina's development, Zhang led HiChina through two rounds of fundraising with major investors including IDG Ventures, TPG Newbridge, and more.

In 1998, Zhang completed his Master's degree at Huazhong University of Science and Technology.

In November 2001, Zhang chose to abdicate his position at HiChina, only remaining as a shareholder, and collaborated with his long-time friends to found a new company "VeryE.com". In February 2004, VeryE obtained investment from Sumitomo Mitsui Banking Corporation, Japan Asia Investment Co. (JAIC), MIH Investments, and became Tixa Co. (WWW.TIXA.COM).

In September 2009, Alibaba acquired HiChina and later built it into Alibaba Cloud (Aliyun), maintaining its position as the top domain name registration and web hosting service company in China and later as a leader in cloud services.

== Notable investments ==
- Visual China Group 视觉中国
- XiMaLaYa FM 喜马拉雅
- ShenZhouRong 神州融
- Hylanda 海量信息
- HeYinLiang 合音量

== Other positions ==
- Investment and Financing Committee (CIFC)
- Distinguished Guest of the China Internet Conference

== Honors and awards ==
- Tixa Co. – Top 100 Innovative Companies in Asia (2005, Red Herring Asia)
- Tixa Co. – Innovator 50 (2005, Internet Society of China)
- Best Investors in China (2006, Forbes)
- Most Influential Angel Investors in China (2007, The 1st China PE Influence Awards)
- Most Active Angel Investors in China (2007)
