= Ablative brain surgery =

Surgical ablation of brain tissue to treat neurological or psychological disorders

- Other names: Brain lesioning
- Specialty: Neurology

Ablative brain surgery (also known as brain lesioning) is the surgical ablation by various methods of brain tissue to treat neurological or psychological disorders. The word "ablation" stems from the Latin ablatus meaning "carried away". In most cases, however, ablative brain surgery does not involve removing brain tissue, but rather destroying tissue and leaving it in place. The lesions it causes are irreversible. There are some target nuclei for ablative surgery and deep brain stimulation. Those nuclei are the motor thalamus, the globus pallidus, and the subthalamic nucleus.

Ablative brain surgery was first introduced by Pierre Flourens (1794–1867), a French physiologist. He removed different parts of the nervous system from animals and observed what effects were caused by the removal of certain parts. For example, if an animal could not move its arm after a certain part was removed, it was assumed that the region would control arm movements. The method of removal of part of the brain was termed "experimental ablation". With the use of experimental ablation, Flourens claimed to find the area of the brain that controlled heart rate and breathing.

Ablative brain surgery is also often used as a research tool in neurobiology. For example, by ablating specific brain regions and observing differences in animals subjected to behavioral tests, the functions of all the removed areas may be inferred.

Experimental ablation is used in research on animals. Such research is considered unethical on humans due to the irreversible effects and damages caused by the lesion and by the ablation of brain tissues. However, the effects of brain lesions (caused by accidents or diseases) on behavior can be observed to draw conclusions on the functions of different parts of the brain.

== Uses ==
=== Parkinson's disease ===
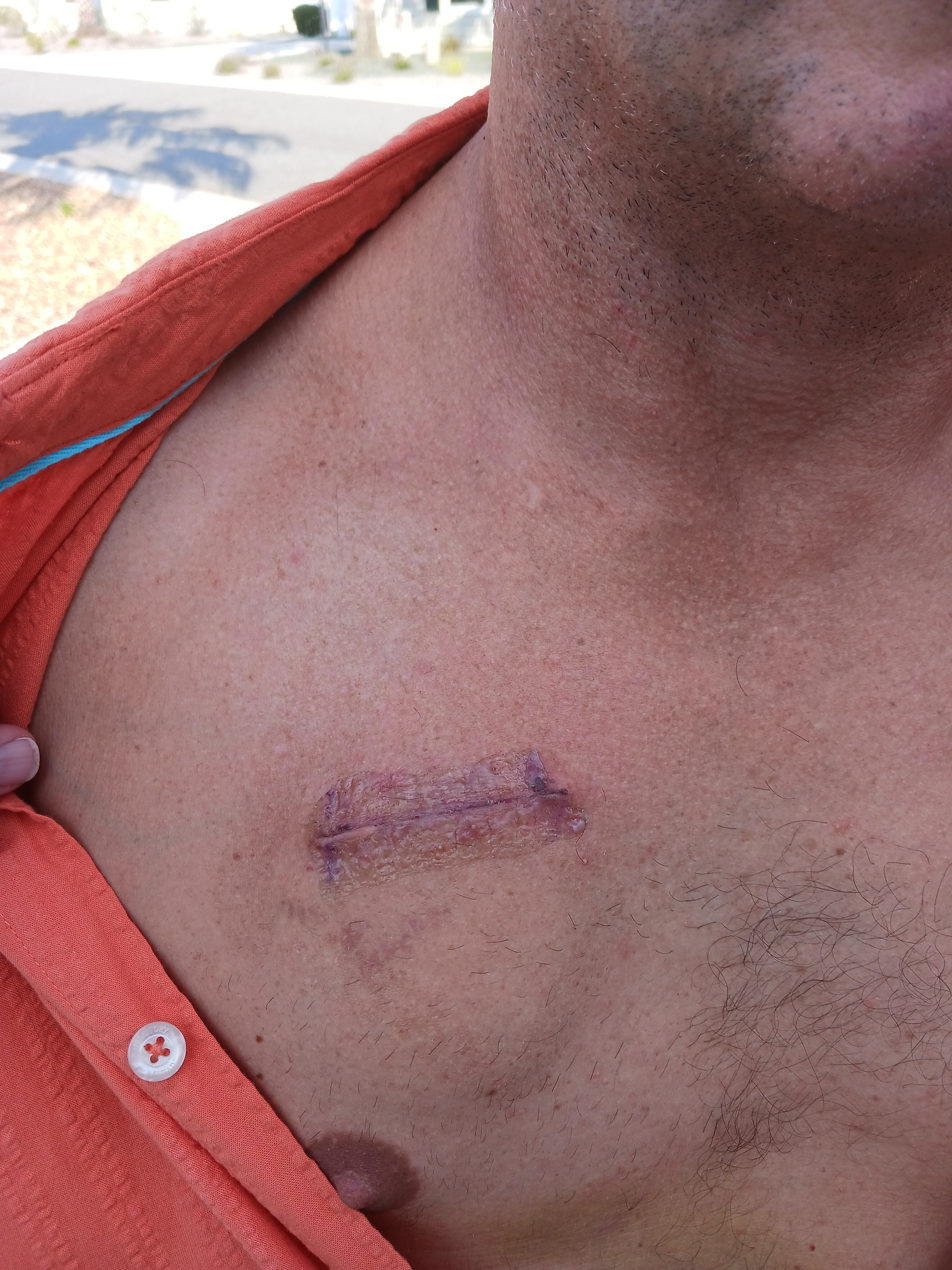
An implanted neurostimulator, sometimes called a 'brain pacemaker', in an adult male as part of ablative brain surgery.

Parkinson's disease is a progressive degenerative disease of the basal ganglia, characterized by the loss of dopaminergic cells of the substantia nigra, pars compacta (SNc). Surgical ablation has been used to treat Parkinson's disease. In the 1990s, the pallidum was a common surgical target. Unilateral pallidotomy improves tremor and dyskinesia on one side of the body (opposite the side of the brain surgery), but bilateral pallidotomy was found to cause irreversible deterioration in speech and cognition.

Two other rapidly evolving or potential surgical approaches to Parkinson's disease are deep brain stimulation (DBS) and restorative therapies.

Deep brain stimulation is a surgical treatment involving the implantation of a neurostimulator medical device, sometimes called a 'brain pacemaker', which sends electrical impulses to specific parts of the brain. Generally, deep brain stimulation surgery is considered preferable to ablation because it has the same effect and is adjustable and reversible.

The advent of deep brain stimulation has been an important advance in the treatment of Parkinson's disease. DBS may be employed in the management of medication-refractory tremor or treatment-related motor complications, and may benefit between 4.5% and 20% of patients at some stage of their disease course. DBS at high frequency often has behavioral effects that are similar to those of lesioning.

In Australia, patients with Parkinson's disease are reviewed by specialized DBS teams who assess the likely benefits and risks associated with DBS for each individual. The aim of these guidelines is to assist neurologists and general physicians identify patients who may benefit from referral to a DBS team. Common indications for referral are motor fluctuations and/or dyskinesias that are not adequately controlled with optimised medical therapy, medication-refractory tremor, and intolerance to medical therapy. Early referral for consideration of DBS is recommended as soon as optimised medical therapy fails to offer satisfactory motor control.

The thalamus is another potential target for treating a tremor; in some countries, so is the subthalamic nucleus, although not in the United States due to its severe side effects. Stimulation of portions of the thalamus or lesioning has been used for various psychiatric and neurological conditions, and when practiced for movement disorders the target is in the motor nuclei of the thalamus. Thalamotomy is another surgical option in the treatment of Parkinson's disease. However, rigidity is not fully controlled after successful thalamotomy, it is replaced by hypotonia. Furthermore, significant complications can occur, for example, left ventral-lateral thalamotomy in a right-handed patient results in verbal deterioration while right thalamotomy causes visual-spatial defects. However, for patients for whom DBS is not feasible, ablation of the subthalamic nucleus has been shown to be safe and effective. DBS is not suitable for certain patients. Patients with immunodeficiencies are an example of a situation in which DBS is not a suitable procedure. However, a major reason as to why DBS is not often performed is the cost. Because of its high cost, DBS cannot be performed in regions of the world that are not wealthy. In the case of such circumstances, a permanent lesion in the subthalamic nucleus (STN) is created as it is a more favourable surgical procedure. The surgical procedure is going to be done on the non-dominant side of the brain; a lesion might be favored to evade numerous pacemaker replacements. More so, patients who gain relief from stimulation devoid of any side effects and need a pacemaker change may have a lesion performed on them in the same position. The stimulation parameters act as a guide for the preferred size of the lesion. In order to identify the part of the brain that is to be destroyed, new techniques such as micro electrode mapping have been developed.

=== Cluster headaches ===
Cluster headaches occur in cyclical patterns or clusters—which gives the condition of its name. Cluster headache is one of the most painful types of headache. Bouts of frequent cluster headaches may last from weeks to months. Attempts have been made to treat cluster headaches via ablation of the trigeminal nerve, but have not been very effective. Other surgical treatments for cluster headaches are currently under investigation.

=== Psychiatric disorders ===
Ablative psychosurgery continues to be used in a few centres in various countries. In the US there are a few centres including Massachusetts General Hospital that carry out ablative psychosurgical procedures. Belgium, the United Kingdom, and Venezuela are other examples of countries where the technique is still used. In the People's Republic of China, surgical ablation was used to treat psychological and neurological disorders, particularly schizophrenia, but also including clinical depression, and obsessive-compulsive disorder. The official Xinhua News Agency has since reported that China's Ministry of Health has banned the procedure for schizophrenia and severely restricted the practice for other conditions. In recent studies, deep brain stimulation (DBS) is beginning to replace ablative brain surgery for severe psychiatric conditions that are generally treatment resistant, such as obsessive-compulsive disorder.

== Methods ==
Experimental ablation involves the drilling of holes in the skull of an animal and inserting an electrode or a small tube called a cannula into the brain using a stereotactic apparatus. A brain lesion can be created by conducting electricity through the electrode which damages the targeted area of the brain. likewise, chemicals can be inserted in the cannula which could possibly damages the area of interest. By comparing the prior behavior of the animal to after the lesion, the researcher can predict the function of damaged brain segment. Recently, lasers have been shown to be effective in ablation of both cerebral and cerebellar tissue. A laser technology called MRI-guided laser ablation, for example, allows great precision in location and size of the lesion and the causes little to no thermal damage to adjacent tissue. The Texas Children's Hospital is one of the first to use this MRI guided method to destroy and treat brain lesions effectively and precisely. A prime example is a patient at this hospital who now no longer undergoes frequent seizures because of the success of this treatment. MRI-guided laser ablation is also used for ablating brain, prostate and liver tumors. Heating or freezing are also alternative methods to ablative brain surgery.

=== Sham lesions ===
A sham lesion is a way for researchers to give a placebo lesion to animals involved in experimental ablation. Whenever a cannula or electrode is placed into brain tissue, unintended additional damage is caused by the instrument itself. A sham lesion is simply the placement of the lesioning instrument into the same spot it would be placed in a regular lesion, only there is no chemical or electrical process. This technique allows researchers to properly compare to an appropriate control group by controlling for the damage done separate from the intended lesion.

=== Excitotoxic lesions ===
An excitotoxic lesion is the process of an excitatory amino acid being injected into the brain using a cannula. The amino acid is used to kill neurons by essentially stimulating them to death. Kainic acid is an example of an excitatory amino acid used in this type of lesion. One crucial benefit to this lesion is its specificity. The chemicals are selective in that they do not damage the surrounding axons of nearby neurons, but only the target neurons.

=== Radio frequency lesions ===
Radio frequency (RF) lesions are produced by electrodes placed in the brain tissue. RF current is an alternating current of very high frequency. The process during which the current passes through tissue produces heat that kills cells in the surrounding area. Unlike excitotoxic lesions, RF lesions destroy everything in the nearby vicinity of the electrode tip.

The use of ablative brain surgery on the nucleus accumbens is the wrong method to treat addictions according to Dr. Charles O'Brien. Dr. John Adler, however, believes ablation can provide valuable information about how the nucleus accumbens works.

== See also ==
- Ablation (artificial intelligence), analogous process used in artificial neural networks
- Psychosurgery
