= History of Toyota =

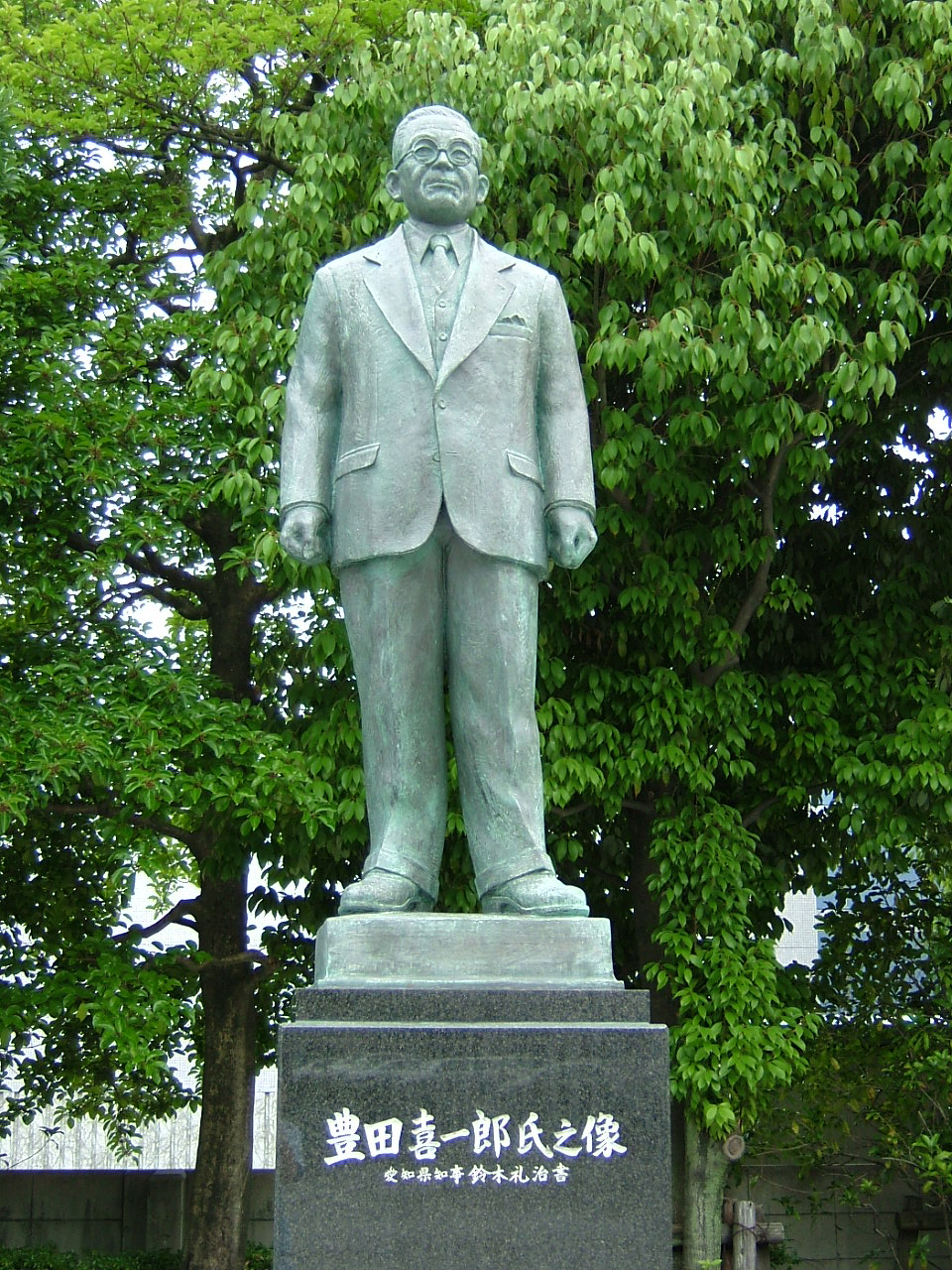
Toyota founder Kiichiro Toyoda

Toyota Logo EU

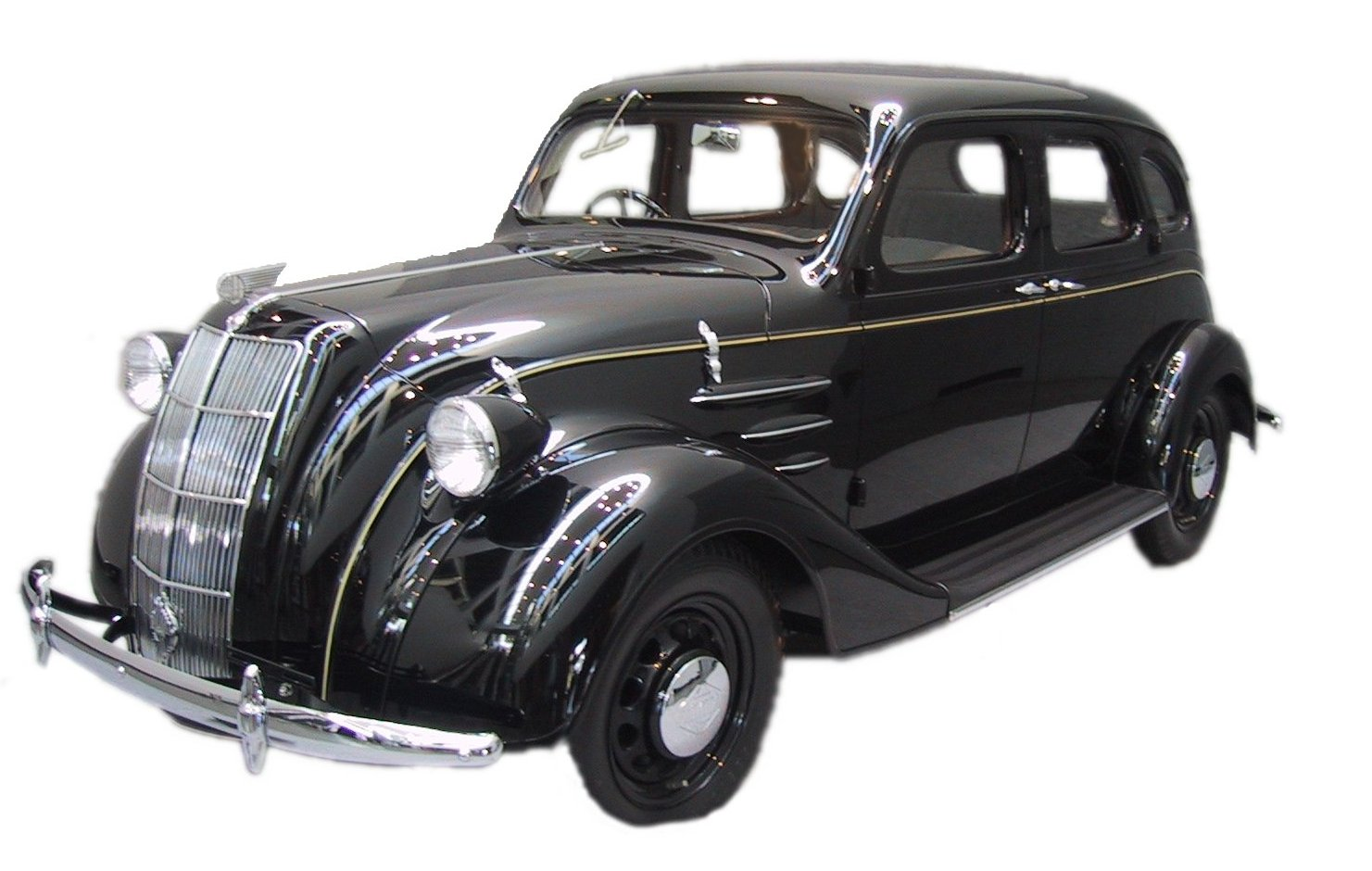
Replica of the Toyota Model AA, the first production model of Toyota in 1936

The history of Toyota started in 1933 with the company being a division of Toyoda Automatic Loom Works devoted to the production of cars under the direction of the founder's son, Kiichiro Toyoda. Kiichiro Toyoda had traveled to Europe and the United States in 1929 to investigate automobile production and had begun researching gasoline-powered engines in 1930. Toyoda Automatic Loom Works was encouraged to develop automobile production by the Japanese government, which needed domestic vehicle production, due to the war with China. Kiichiro Toyoda seized this opportunity to establish the Automotive Production Division on September 1, 1933, and began preparing to build prototype vehicles. In 1934, the division produced its first Type A Engine, which was used in the first Model A1 passenger car in May 1935 and the G1 truck in August 1935. Production of the Model AA passenger car started in 1936. Early vehicles bear a striking resemblance to the Dodge Power Wagon and 1930's Chevrolet, with some parts actually interchanging with their American originals.

Although the Toyota Group is best known today for its cars, it is still in the textile business and still makes automatic looms, which are now computerized, and electric sewing machines which are available worldwide.

== Beginning ==
Toyota Motor Co. was established as an independent and separate company in 1937. Although the founding family's name was written in the Kanji "豊田" (rendered as "Toyoda"), the company name was changed to a similar word in katakana - トヨタ (rendered as "Toyota") because the latter has 8 strokes which is regarded as a lucky number in East Asian culture. Since Kanji are essentially Chinese characters, in Chinese speaking markets, the company and its vehicles are still referred to by the original Kanji name (simplified Chinese: 丰田; traditional Chinese: 豐田; pinyin: fēng tián), but with Chinese pronunciation.

With the Japanese economy modernizing and expanding during the 1930s, both Ford and GM had built factories in Japan where vehicles were imported from America in knock down kits and assembled locally. The Ford Yokohama facility started in March 1925 and GM built a factory at Osaka starting in April 1927. By 1929, both Ford and GM controlled most of the Japanese automobile market, producing 28,000 vehicles in 1929. During development of the company's first car, the Toyota AA, the company purchased locally manufactured GM and Ford products, reverse engineered them, and hired engineers who had previously worked at the Japanese Ford and GM factories in developing Toyota products.

== World War II ==
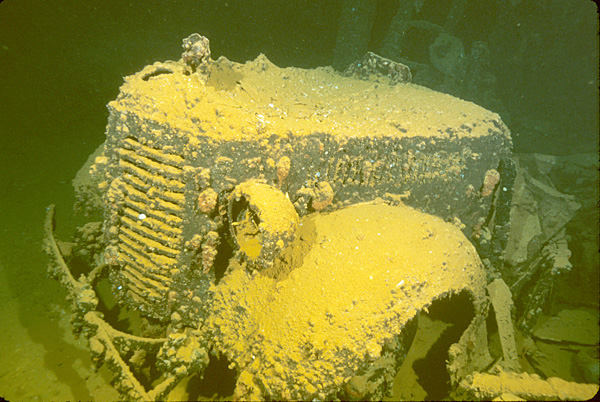
Wreck of a military Toyota KB truck at the bottom of Chuuk Lagoon, in the cargo hold of sunken navy cargo vessel

During the Pacific War (World War II) Toyota was mainly dedicated to producing trucks and buses for the Imperial Japanese Army, mostly variants of the Toyota G1 truck, including a simplified variant with only one headlight and plywood body panels due to severe shortages of materials. Toyota also produced Toyota AA passenger car variants and Su-Ki amphibious vehicles for the military.

At the Army Air Headquarters' request, Toyota jointly established Tokai Aircraft Industries (later Aisin) with Kawasaki Heavy Industries. Separately from Tokai, Toyota also manufactured Type 98 (Ha 13 "Ko" Model 2), radial aircraft engines and developed a two-seater helicopter prototype in 1943. In January 1944, Toyota was designated as a munitions company and came under the control of the Ministry of Munitions.

On August 14, 1945, during bombings of Nagoya, about a quarter of the Koromo plant was destroyed in an American bombing raid. This was the result of "pumpkin bombs" dropped by the 509th Composite Group of the U.S. Air Force, led by Charles Sweeney, the same group responsible for dropping the atom bomb on Nagasaki. The war ended shortly before another scheduled Allied bombing run on the Toyota factories in Aichi.

== Postwar growth ==
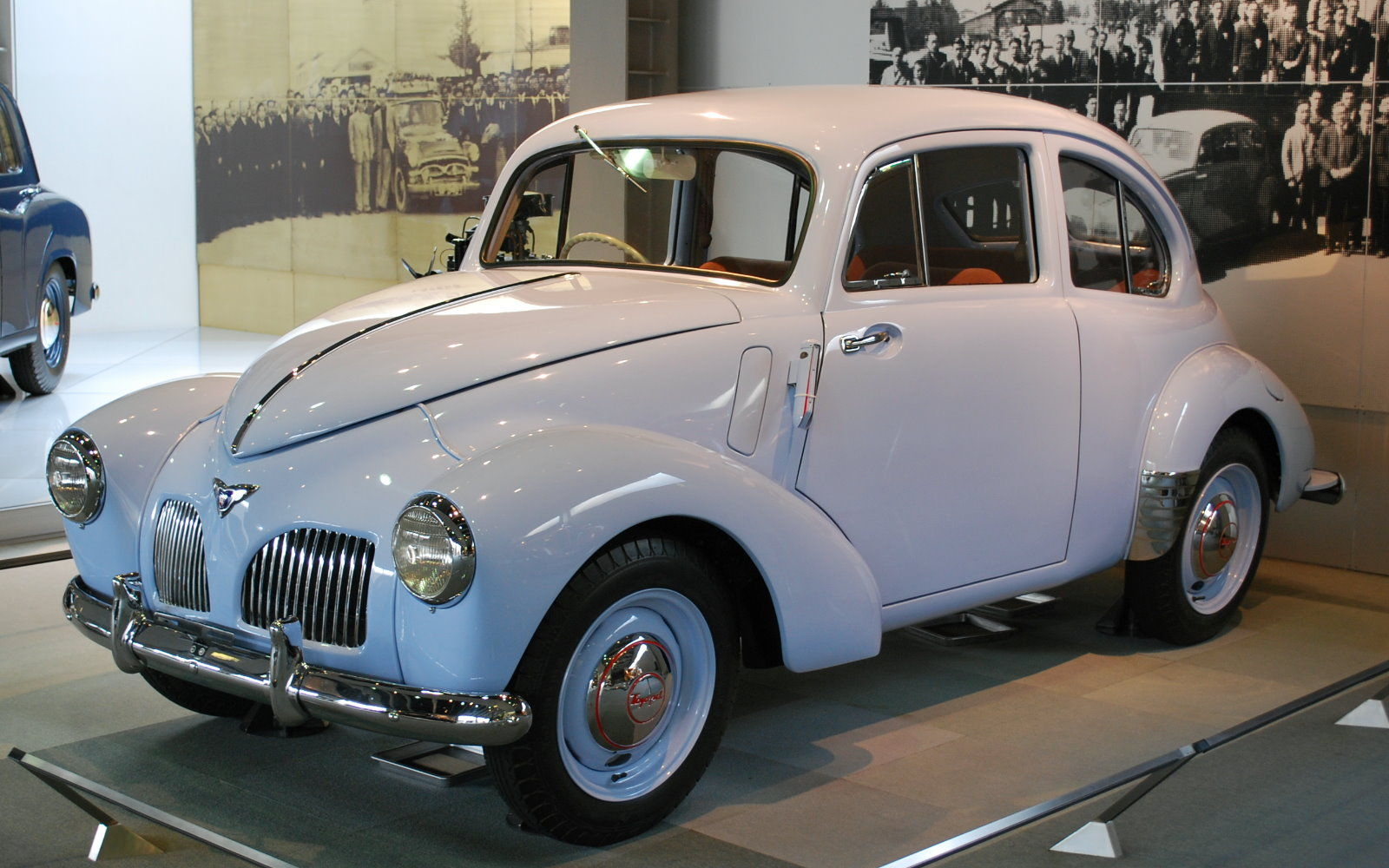
1947 Toyopet Model SA

After World War II, Japan experienced extreme economic difficulty. Commercial passenger car production started in 1947 with the model SA. The company was on the brink of bankruptcy by the end of 1949, but the company eventually obtained a loan from a consortium of banks which stipulated an independent sales operation and elimination of "excess manpower".

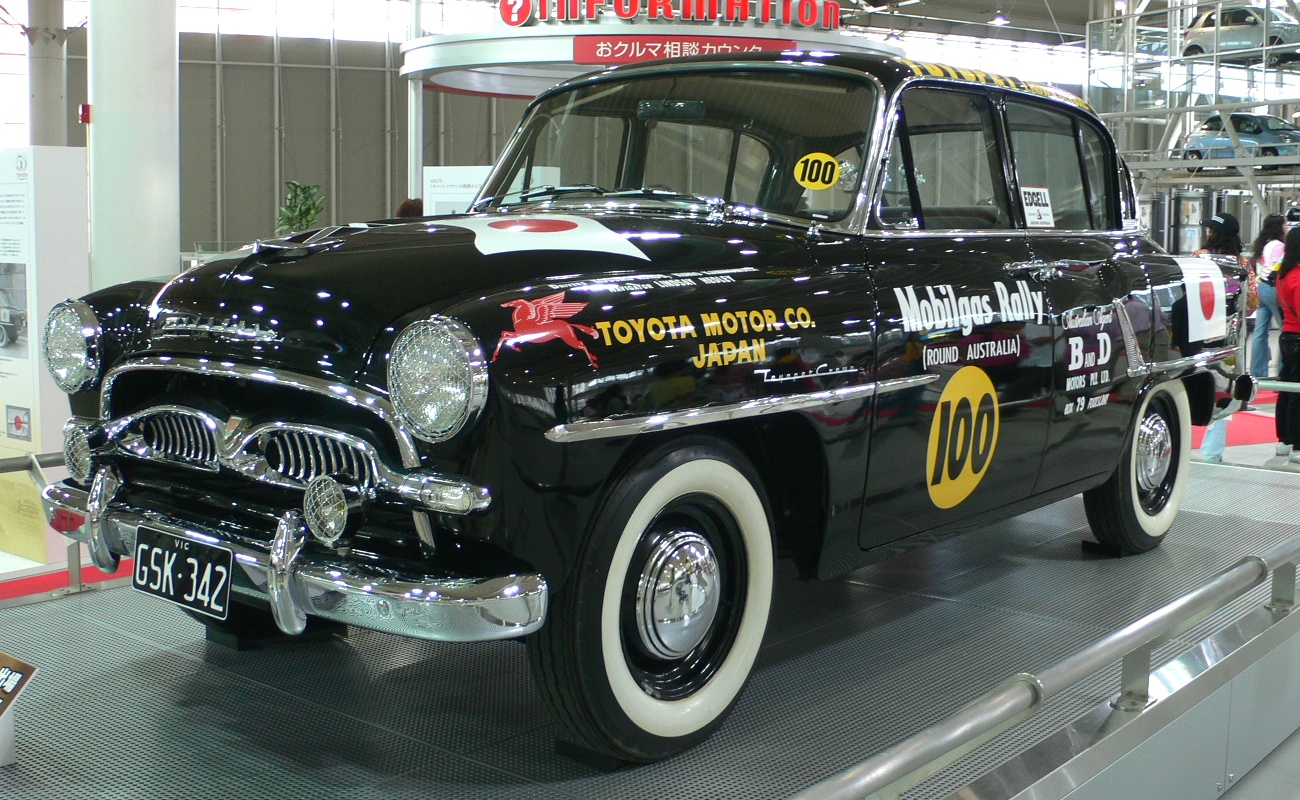
1957 Toyopet Crown

In June 1950, the company produced only 300 trucks and was on the verge of going out of business. The management announced layoffs and wage reductions, and in response the union went on a strike that lasted two months. The strike was resolved by an agreement that included layoffs and pay reductions but also the resignation of the president at the time, Kiichiro Toyoda. Toyoda was succeeded by Taizo Ishida, who was the chief executive of the Toyoda Automatic Loom company. The first few months of the Korean War resulted in an order of over 5,000 vehicles from the US military, and the company was revived. Ishida was credited for his focus on investment in equipment. One example was the construction of the Motomachi Plant in 1959, which gave Toyota a decisive lead over Nissan during the 1960s.

In 1950, a separate sales company, Toyota Motor Sales Co., was established (which lasted until July 1982). In April 1956, the Toyopet dealer chain was established. In 1957, the Crown became the first Japanese car to be exported to the United States and Toyota's American and Brazilian divisions, Toyota Motor Sales Inc. and Toyota do Brasil S.A., were also established.

Exporting vehicles to the United States meant that for the first time, the company had to confront how its name sounded to native speakers of the English language; namely, "Toyota" has the English word "toy" in its first syllable. Toyota Motor Sales, USA's first sales administrator James F. McGraw bluntly told his new Japanese supervisors after joining the company in 1959: "'Toy' sounds like a toy and toys break". At the time, "yota" and "yoda" did not have any significant semantic meaning in English. That changed in 1980 when Lucasfilm released The Empire Strikes Back, in which there was a character called Yoda. The inevitable result was a 2001 practical joke in which a Florida woman expecting a Toyota as a prize from her employer got a "toy Yoda", resulting in academic commentary on word boundary confusion and the law of practical jokes.

== Global presence ==
Toyota began to expand in the 1960s with a new research and development facility, a presence in Thailand was established, the 10 millionth model was produced, a Deming Prize, and partnerships with Hino Motors and Daihatsu were also established. The first Toyota built outside Japan was in November 12, 1962, in São Bernardo do Campo, Brazil. By the end of the decade, Toyota had established a worldwide presence, as the company had exported its one-millionth unit.

The first Japanese vehicles to arrive in the American continents were five Land Cruisers in El Salvador in May 1953. The first Toyotas sent to Canada were a shipment of 115 Crowns sent in February 1965.

The first Toyotas sent to Europe were two Toyopet Tiaras sent to Finland for evaluation in June 1962, but no sales followed, although the importer introduced the cars to the press in October the same year. The first European importer was Erla Auto Import A/S of Denmark, who brought in 400 Crowns following a May 1963 agreement to become the distributor for Denmark, Norway, and Sweden. The Netherlands followed in May 1964, and after having established toeholds in countries with little or no indigenous automobile production other markets followed in 1966. In 1968 Toyota established its first European CKD assembler, Salvador Caetano I.M.V.T. of Portugal.

== 2008–2012 ==
With high fuel prices and a weak US economy in mid-2008, Toyota reported a double-digit decline in sales for the month of June, similar to figures reported by the Detroit Big Three. For Toyota, these were attributed mainly to slow sales of its Tundra pickup, as well as shortages of its fuel-efficient vehicles such as the Prius, Corolla and Yaris. In response, the company announced plans to idle its truck plants, while shifting production at other facilities to manufacture in-demand vehicles.

In January 2010, Toyota suspended sales of eight recalled vehicle models to fix accelerator pedals with mechanical problems that could cause them to become stuck. In December 2012, Toyota announced an agreement worth more than US$1 billion to settle a lawsuit involving unintended acceleration in some of its vehicles.

== 2013 to present ==
=== Recalls ===
In late 2025, Toyota announced the recall of more the 390,000 vehicles due to a software problem related to backup camera functionality; this impacted models Tundra and Tundra Hybrid (2022 to 2025) and Sequoia Hybrid (2023 to 2025).
