= Takashi Taguchi =

Takashi Taguchi may refer to:

- Takashi Taguchi (actor) (1942–2016), Japanese voice actor
- Takashi Taguchi (handballer) (born 1961), Japanese former handball player
