= Toyota G1 =

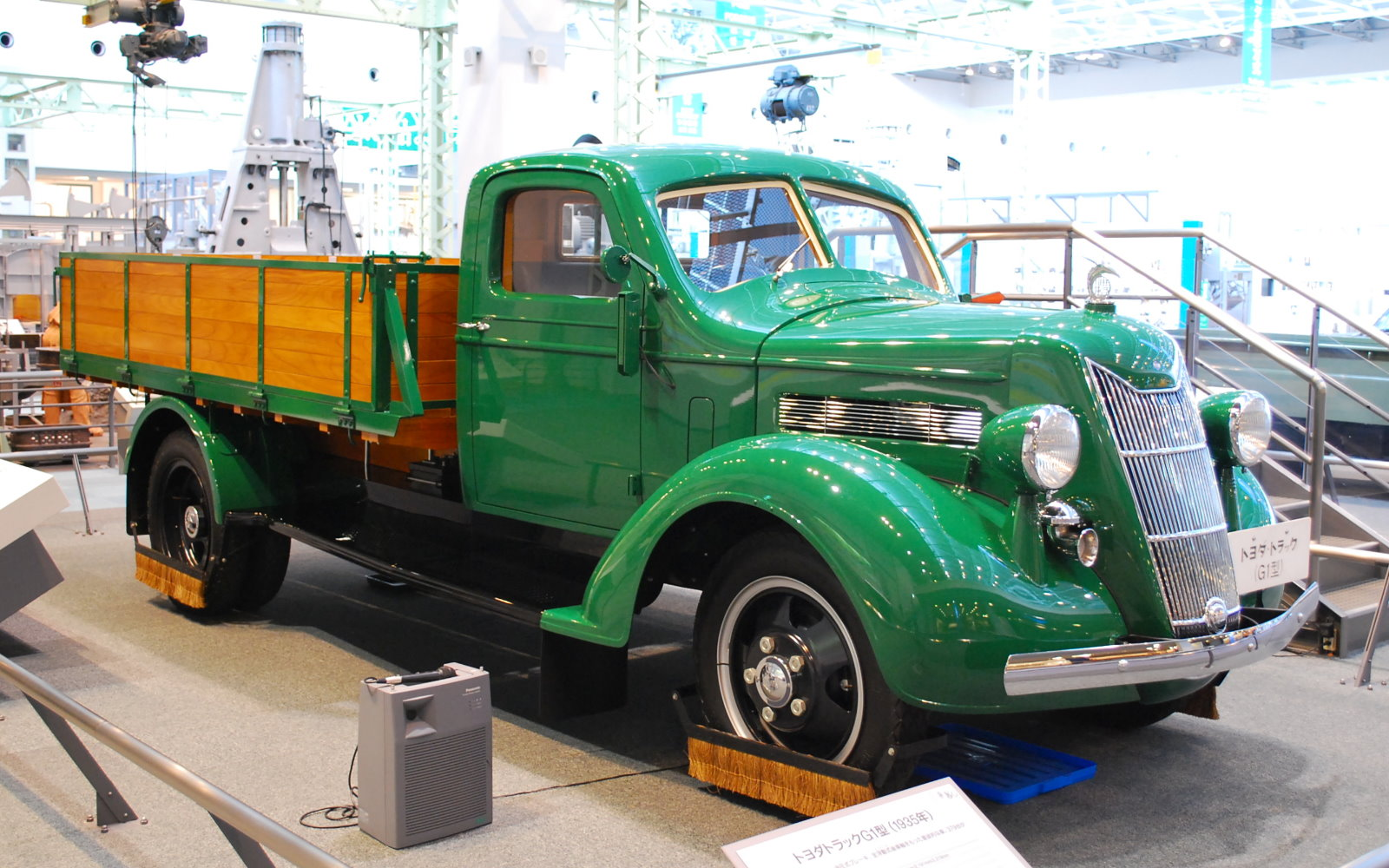
A replica of Toyota G1 in Toyota Museum

The Toyoda G1 (Toyota G1) was the first truck built by the company that became Toyota. It was 6 m (20 ft) long, could carry 1.5 tons, and was loosely based on similar class Ford and GM trucks.

The G1 was succeeded by a line of similar Toyota trucks as technology progressed. The entire series was replaced by the BM truck in 1947.

== G1 ==
Toyoda G1

Overview
- Manufacturer: Toyoda (later renamed Toyota)
- Production: 1935–1936

Body and chassis
- Class: Medium truck (1½-ton truck)
- Body style: 2-door cab, various bodies
- Layout: Front-engine, rear-wheel-drive

Powertrain
- Engine: 3.4 L Type A I6

Dimensions
- Wheelbase: 3,594 mm (141.5 in)
- Length: 5,950 mm (234.3 in)
- Width: 2,191 mm (86.3 in)
- Height: 2,219 mm (87.4 in)
- Curb weight: 2,470 kg (5,445 lb)

Chronology
- Successor: Toyota GA

Kiichiro Toyoda's desire was to produce automobiles. Unfortunately, the A1 passenger car that was under development in 1935 was unlikely to sell well due to Japan's underdeveloped economy. Work still progressed on the A1 but emphasis was shifted to a truck derived from the same engine and chassis (slightly lengthened).

The financial resources of the parent company, Toyoda Automatic Loom Works, were stretched almost to breaking point and large loans were required to put the G1 into production at the Kariya loom factory. The total cost of the G1 development was well several times the annual profits of Toyoda.

The G1 was sold as a Toyoda. The company changed its name from Toyoda to Toyota at the introduction of the G1's successor, the GA.

Since this was Toyoda's first production vehicle at the loom works factory, there were still many problems to be solved. When the first production examples were driven to Tokyo for the motor show, they were packed with many spare parts. These spare parts were in case something broke during the trip - luckily only a few replacement parts were required. Early sales were mostly to people who were sympathetic to local manufacturers and who were willing to endure many failures. To support them, design engineers from the factory were often sent to do repairs in order to learn which parts needed the most attention. For example, broken rear axle housings were common until new welding methods were developed. Repairs were done for free and sometimes entire trucks were replaced for free. Rectifications were then applied as running changes on the production line, reflecting Toyota's "5 Whys" problem solving philosophy.

=== Dates and Production Figures ===
The G1 prototypes were completed in August 1935, shown to the public in November 1935, and released for sale in December 1935. This was just in time to meet the government deadline for licensing motor vehicle producers. 379 examples of the G1 were built before production ended in August 1936.

=== Mechanicals ===
The G1 used the 3389 cc Type A six-cylinder engine that was also used in the A1 and AA. It produced 65 hp (48 kW) at 3,000 rpm.

A single solid axle housing with 2 single wheels was used at the front while a single solid axle housing with 2 pairs of double wheels was used at the rear.

== DA bus ==
Toyoda DA bus

Overview
- Manufacturer: Toyota
- Production: 1936-1940

Body and chassis
- Class: Bus

Powertrain
- Engine: Type A I6

Dimensions
- Wheelbase: 3,594 mm (141.5 in)
- Length: 6,700 mm (263.8 in)
- Width: 2,100 mm (82.7 in)
- Height: 2,590 mm (102.0 in)
- Curb weight: 1,630 kg (3,594 lb)

A bus based on the G1 chassis, with a lowered floor. Bus bodies were built by several manufacturers; one manufacturer's body seated 21 passengers. (The DA bus should not be confused with the much later DA truck line introduced in the later 1950s.)

=== Dates and Production Figures ===
The DA bus was introduced in January 1936 and was discontinued in September 1940.

=== Mechanicals ===
Similar to the G1.

== GA ==
A minor update to the G1.

=== Dates and Production Figures ===
The GA replaced the G1 in September 1936 and was discontinued in September 1940.

=== Mechanicals ===
Similar to the G1.

== GY ==
A version of the GA with the wheelbase shortened to 3,300 mm (129.9 in).

=== Dates ===
The GY was introduced in May 1937 and was discontinued in November 1940.

=== Mechanicals ===
Similar to the GA.

== GB ==
Toyota GB

Overview
- Manufacturer: Toyota
- Production: 1938–1942

Body and chassis
- Class: Medium truck (2-ton truck)
- Body style: 2-door cab, various bodies
- Layout: Front-engine, rear-wheel-drive

Powertrain
- Engine: 3.4 L Type B I6

Dimensions
- Wheelbase: 3,609 mm (142.1 in)
- Length: 6,412 mm (252.4 in)
- Width: 2,190 mm (86.2 in)
- Height: 2,220 mm (87.4 in)
- Curb weight: 2,600 kg (5,732 lb)

Improved version of the GA, introduced in December 1938, with a redesigned front end, greater length, a slightly longer wheelbase of 3,609 mm (142.1 in), and a new 75 PS (55 kW) Type B engine, a more powerful version of the Type A engine with a higher compression ratio. In January 1940 the engine was further upgraded to 78 PS (57 kW) and the chassis was refined.

=== Dates and Production Figures ===
Production was 19,870 units between December 1938 and April 1942.

=== Mechanicals ===
Similar to the GA, except for the changes mentioned above.

== DB bus ==
A bus based on the GB chassis, otherwise similar to the previous DA bus. (This DB bus should not be confused with Toyota's much later DB line of diesel buses introduced in the later 1950s.)

=== Dates and Production Figures ===
The DB bus was introduced in June 1939 and was discontinued in September 1941.

=== Mechanicals ===
Similar to the GB.

== HB ==
A version of the GB with the wheelbase shortened to 3,300 mm (129.9 in). A bus was also built on this chassis.

=== Dates ===
The HB was introduced in November 1939 and was discontinued in May 1941.

=== Mechanicals ===
Similar to the GB.

== KB ==
Toyota KB

Overview
- Manufacturer: Toyota
- Production: 1942–1944

Body and chassis
- Class: Medium truck (4-ton truck)
- Body style: 2-door cab, various bodies
- Layout: Front-engine, rear-wheel-drive

Powertrain
- Engine: 3.4 L Type B I6

Dimensions
- Wheelbase: 4,000 mm (157.5 in)
- Length: 6,458 mm (254.3 in)
- Width: 2,190 mm (86.2 in)
- Height: 2,235 mm (88.0 in)
- Curb weight: 2,720 kg (6,000 lb)

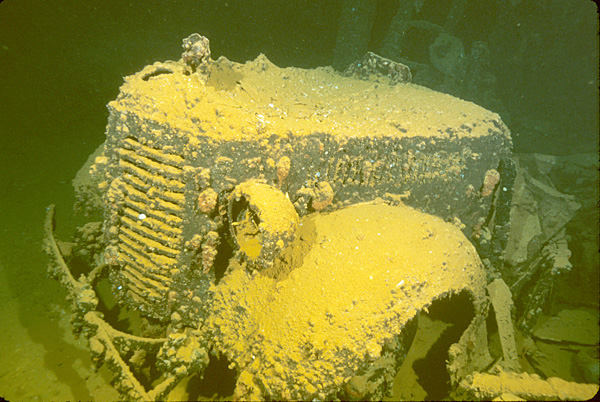
Sunken Toyota KB truck in Chuuk Lagoon, Micronesia

Introduced in March 1942, the KB was the replacement for the GB. Designed to meet the military's demand for heavier trucks, its payload was increased to four tons, and its wheelbase was extended to 4,000 mm (157.5 in). The body was still made from steel but was of a simpler design with fewer curves.

=== Dates and Production Figures ===
Production was 21,130 units between the KB's introduction in March 1942 and its discontinuation in March 1944.

=== Mechanicals ===
Similar to the GB, except for the changes mentioned above.

== LB ==
A version of the KB with the wheelbase shortened to 3,594 mm (141.5 in), the same as that of the preceding GB. This shorter chassis was also intended to be used for buses and specialized trucks.

=== Dates ===
The LB was introduced in April 1942 and was discontinued in December 1943.

=== Mechanicals ===
Similar to the KB.

== KC ==
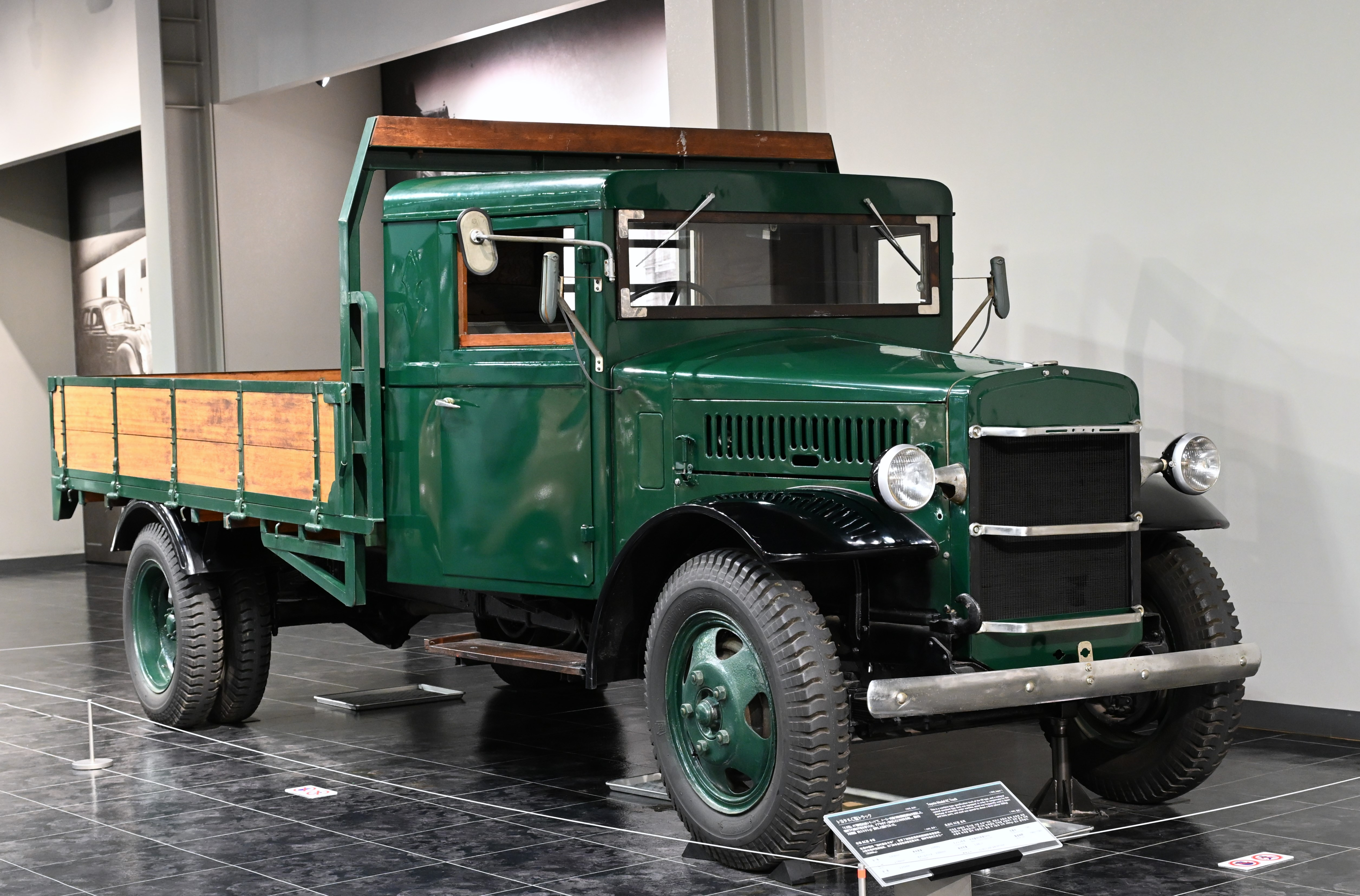
1945 Toyota Model KC Truck

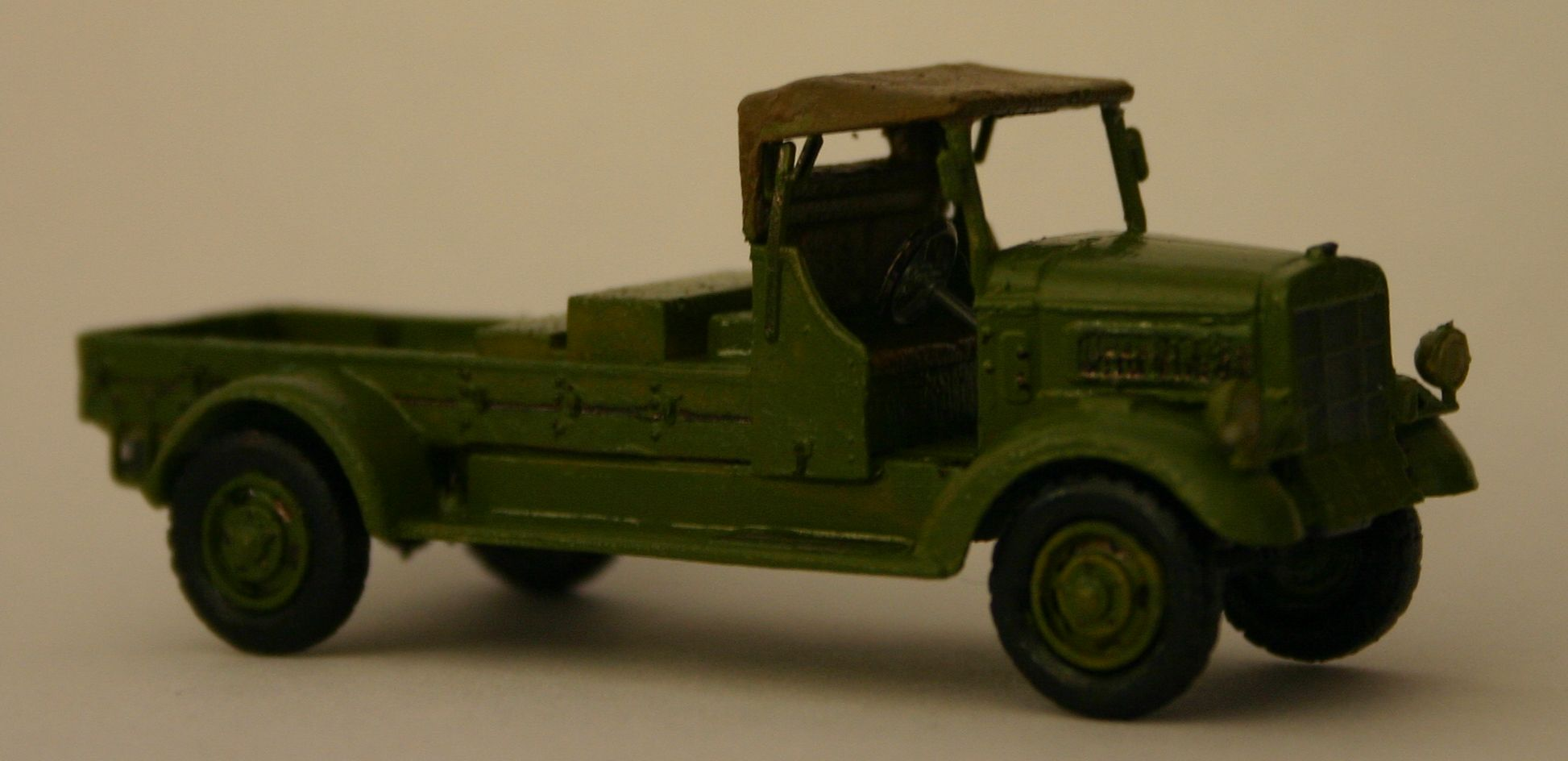
Scale model of a Toyota KC aircraft starter truck, minus the starting equipment.

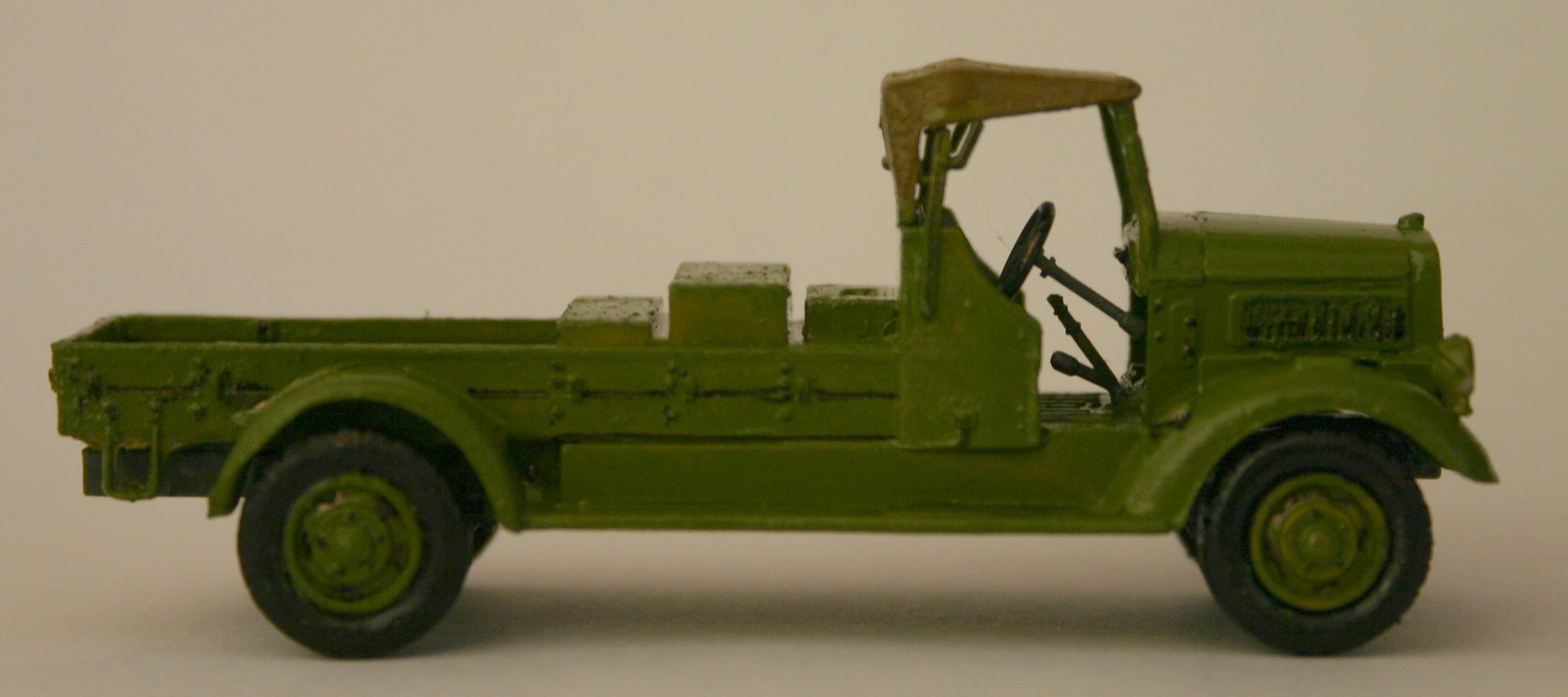
Scale model of a Toyota KC aircraft starter truck, minus the starting equipment. This is a very early version that still has curved guards over the wheels. Later versions had flat guards and a single headlight.

The KC was an update to the KB in response to official government specifications for a wartime truck. Nicknamed the "Toyota To-Ki", the KC used about thirty percent less steel, which was in short supply in Japan during the war, than preceding trucks. Former Toyota trucks had a torque tube driveshaft mount, but this required steel components that were difficult to obtain under wartime conditions, so the KC switched to a Hotchkiss drive. The engine cover was still metal but other body panels were made from plywood. The body design was extremely boxy, with only simple curves used on the engine cover and a flat radiator with no grill. As the war dragged on and material shortages grew worse, more of the body was built from wood, the headlamps were reduced to one, and only rear brakes were used. However, once the war ended in August 1945, Toyota continued production of the KC without these former material restrictions.

One special use for the KC truck was to start aircraft engines on Japanese military airfields, after being equipped with a Hucks starter. A power take-off was taken from after the gearbox. It rose behind the cabin and then projected forward. This was mated to the spinner on an aircraft's propeller to start the aircraft engine. Because this version of the KC wasn't used for heavy cargo, its cargo bed was narrow and the rear wheels were singles instead of the normal doubles. Also, the cabin was very basic, having plywood sides, no doors and a canvas roof. The starter truck was unique in having running boards, due to its narrow cargo bed. Hasegawa made a 1:72 scale plastic model of the KC starter truck labelled as "Starter Truck Toyota GB", even although the real GB had a curved radiator grill and more complex bodywork.

=== Dates and Production Figures ===
The KC was introduced in November 1943. Production continued until March 1947, when it was replaced by the BM model.

=== Mechanicals ===
Similar to the KB, except for changes mentioned above.

== KCY ==
A military amphibious vehicle using a metal boat style hull and KC truck mechanicals.

=== Dates and Production Figures ===
Production was 198 units between November 1943 and August 1944.

=== Mechanicals ===
The engine, gearbox, suspension and rear axle were based on the KC mechanicals. In addition, 4-wheel drive was added via a 2-speed transfer case. Water propulsion was by a PTO driven propeller. Brakes were hydraulic.

== Bibliography ==
- "75 Years of TOYOTA - Vehicle Lineage" (PDF). Toyota. 2012.
- Toyoda, Eiji (1987). Toyota: fifty years in motion. Tokyo: Kodansha International. ISBN 9780870118234.
- Togo, Yukiyasu; Wartman, William (1993). Against all odds. New York: St. Martin's Press. pp. 56–73. ISBN 0-312-09733-6.
