= Takahiro Taguchi =

Japanese footballer and manager

Personal information
- Full name: Takahiro Taguchi
- Date of birth: December 8, 1957 (age 68)
- Place of birth: Tokyo, Japan
- Height: 1.80 m (5 ft 11 in)
- Position: Defender

Youth career
- 1976–1979: Osaka University of Commerce

Senior career*
Years	Team	Apps	(Gls)
1980–1983	Yomiuri	5	(0)
Total		5	(0)

Managerial career
- 2012: Yokohama FC (caretaker)
Medal record
Yomiuri
Winner	Japan Soccer League	1983
Runner-up	Japan Soccer League	1981
Runner-up	Emperor's Cup	1981
- * Club domestic league appearances and goals

Takahiro Taguchi (田口 貴寛, Taguchi Takahiro; born December 8, 1957) is a former Japanese football player and manager.

== Playing career ==
Takahiro Taguchi played for Yomiuri as defender from 1980 to 1983.

== Coaching career ==
Since 1985, Takahiro Taguchi has been a coach for youth teams; e.g. Rissho University, Verdy Kawasaki youth team, Teikyo University. In 2011, he became the coach for Yokohama FC. In, March 2012, manager; Yasuyuki Kishino was sacked. Takahiro Taguchi managed team as caretaker. In 2014, he became coach for FC Gifu, and in July 2016, he resigned.
