= Kumi Taguchi =

Kumi Taguchi may refer to:

- Kumi Taguchi (journalist) (born 1975), Australian broadcaster and presenter
- Kumi Taguchi (actress), Japanese actress in 1970's films
