= Alibaba Cloud =

Chinese cloud computing company

Alibaba Cloud Computing Co. Ltd.

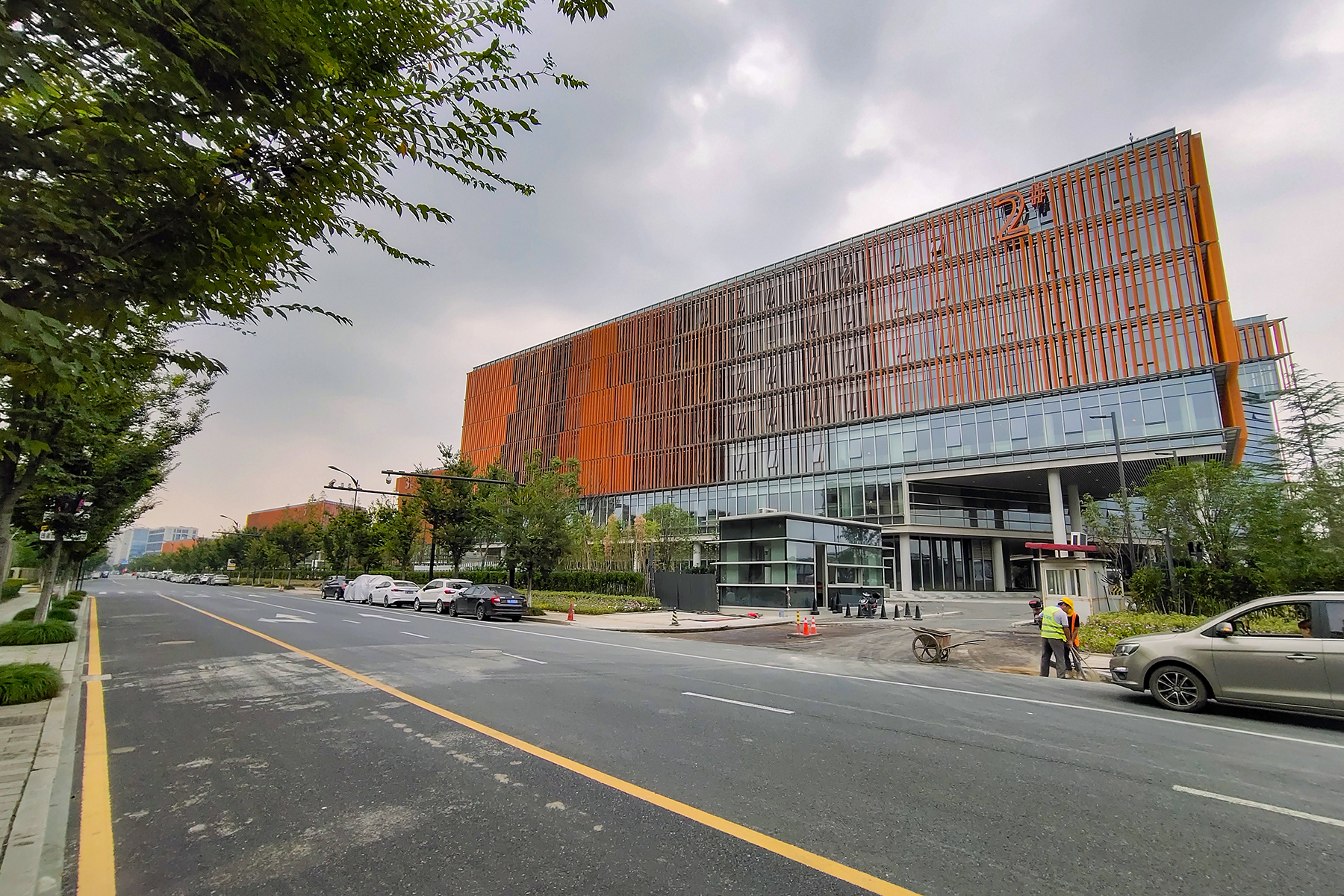
- Campus headquarters in Yuhang, Hangzhou
- Website type: Subsidiary
- Key people: Jack Ma (Executive Chairman); Daniel Zhang (President)
- Industry: Cloud Computing, Web Services
- Products: Qwen
- Parent: Alibaba Group
- Website: alibabacloud.com
- Launched: September 2009; 17 years ago
- Current status: Active

Alibaba Cloud Computing Co. Ltd., also known as Aliyun (Chinese: 阿里云; pinyin: Ālǐyún; lit. 'Ali Cloud'), is a cloud computing company, a subsidiary of Alibaba Group. Alibaba Cloud provides cloud computing services to online businesses and Alibaba's own e-commerce ecosystem. Its international operations are registered and headquartered in Singapore.

Alibaba Cloud offers cloud services that are available on a pay-as-you-go basis, and include elastic compute, data storage, relational databases, big-data processing, DDoS protection and content delivery networks (CDN). Alibaba Cloud also develops the Qwen series of open weights large language models.

It is the largest cloud computing company in China, and in Asia Pacific according to Gartner. Alibaba Cloud operates data centers in 29 regions and 87 availability zones around the globe. As of June 2017, Alibaba Cloud is placed in the Visionaries' quadrant of Gartner's Magic Quadrant for cloud infrastructure as a service, worldwide.

== History ==
Alibaba Cloud was founded in September 2009, and R&D centers and operation centers were opened in Hangzhou, Beijing, and Silicon Valley.

=== 2010–2013 ===
In November 2010, the company supported the first Single's Day (11.11) Taobao shopping festival, with 2.4 billion PageViews (PV) in 24 hours. Two years later, in November 2012, it became the first Chinese cloud service provider to pass ISO27001:2005 (Information Security Management System).

In January 2013, Alibaba Cloud merged with HiChina (founded by Xiangning Zhang) for the www.net.cn business as one of the largest acquisitions in the company's history at the time. In August of that year, ApsaraDB architecture supported 5000 physical machines in a single cluster.

=== 2014–2017 ===
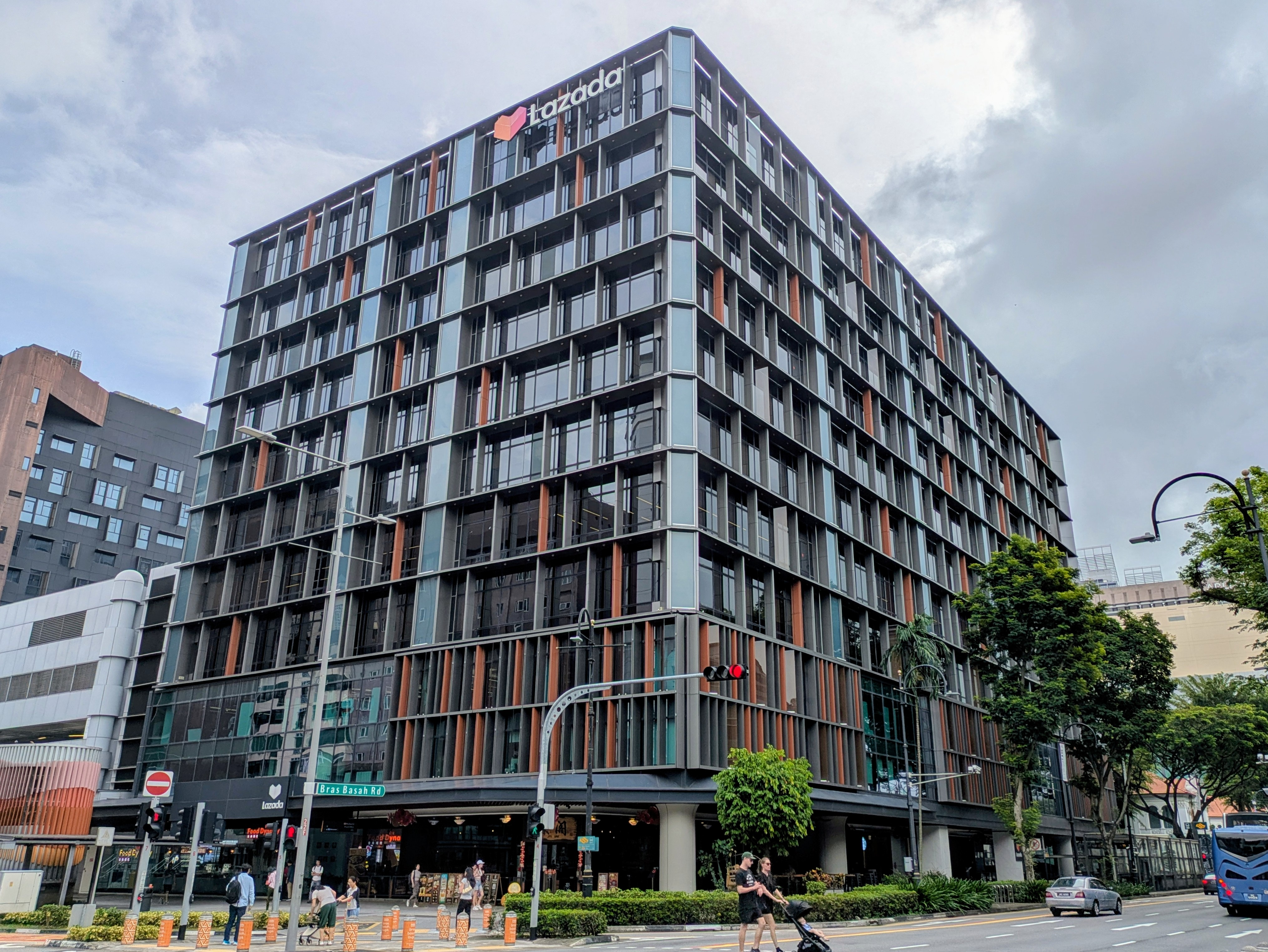
International headquarters of Alibaba Cloud, Lazada One, Singapore.

The company's Hong Kong data center went online in May 2014, and in December of that year, Alibaba Cloud defended a 14-hour-long DDoS attack, peaking at 453.8 Gbit/s.

In July 2015, the Alibaba Group invested US$1 billion in Alibaba Cloud. A month later, Alibaba Cloud's first Singapore data center opened, and Singapore was announced as Alibaba Cloud's overseas headquarters.

Two US data centers went online in October 2015, and that same month MaxCompute took the lead in the Sort Benchmark, sorting 100 TB data in 377 s compared with Apache Spark's previous record of 1406 s. The Alibaba Cloud Computing Conference was also held in October 2015 in Hangzhou and attracted over 20,000 developers. A month later, in November, the company supported the 11.11 shopping festival with a record of $14.2 billion transactions in 24 hours.

Alibaba Cloud partnered with SK Holdings C&C in April 2016 to provide cloud services to Korean and Chinese companies. A month later, the company formalized a joint venture with SoftBank to launch cloud services in Japan that utilize technologies and solutions from Alibaba Cloud.

In June 2016, Alibaba Cloud expanded its data center operations in Singapore with the establishment of a second availability zone. Alibaba Cloud also achieved two new certifications overseas: Singapore Multi-Tier Cloud Security (MTCS) standard Level 3, and the Payment Card Industry Three-Domain Secure (PCI 3DS).

The company partnered with Vodafone Germany in November 2016 for Data Center operations and to provide cloud services to German and European companies.

Alibaba became the official cloud services provider of the Olympics in January 2017. A month later, in February, the company became a founding Member of the EU Cloud Code of Conduct.

In June 2017, Alibaba Cloud was placed in the Visionaries quadrant of Gartner's Magic Quadrant for Cloud Infrastructure as a Service, Worldwide.

Alibaba Cloud partnered with Malaysia's Fusionex in September 2017 to provide cloud solutions in Southeast Asia, and the Malaysia data center commenced operations in October. That same month, the company partnered with Elastic and launched a new service called Alibaba Cloud Elasticsearch.

Alibaba Cloud India data center commenced operations in December 2017. In addition, Alibaba Cloud received the C5 standard certification from the German Federal Office for Information Security (BSI) for its data centers in Germany and Singapore.

=== 2018–2021 ===
In February 2018, Alibaba Cloud's Indonesia data center commenced operations. The company's first data center opening in the Philippines in June 2021.

Alibaba Cloud unveiled the ARM-based Yitian 710 chip, designed in-house, for use in its data centers in October 2021.

On November 24, 2021, the bug Log4Shell was disclosed to Apache by Chen Zhaojun of Alibaba Cloud's Security Team. On December 22, 2021, the Chinese Ministry of Industry and Information Technology suspended a partnership with Alibaba Cloud for "failure in reporting cybersecurity vulnerabilities" related to the Log4Shell bug.

=== 2022 ===
In September 2022, Alibaba Cloud announced a $1 billion pledge to upgrade its global partner ecosystem.

== Data center regions ==
Alibaba Cloud has 25 regional data centres globally. The Data Center in Germany is operated by Vodafone Germany (Frankfurt) and certified with C5.

== Products ==
Alibaba Cloud provides cloud computing IaaS, PaaS, DBaaS and SaaS, including services such as e-commerce, big data, Database, IoT, Object storage (OSS), Kubernetes and data customization which can be managed from Alibaba web page or using aliyun command line tool.

AnalyticDB was first released in May 2018, and the latest version 3.0 was released in 2019.

On April 26, 2019, TPC published TPC-DS benchmark result of AnalyticDB.

In 2019, a paper about the system design of AnalyticDB was published in VLDB conference 2019.

== Academic partners ==
List of academic alliances:

- Shanghai Jiao Tong University
- Universiti Tunku Abdul Rahman (UTAR)
- University of Malaya
- Hong Kong Shue Yan University
- Macao University of Science and Technology
- Singapore University of Social Sciences (SUSS)
- Télécom Paris
- SUPINFO International University
- Université de technologie sino-européenne de l'université de Shanghai
- Gadjah Mada University
- Universitas Prasetiya Mulya
- Bina Nusantara University
- Krida Wacana Christian University
- Hong Kong Institute of Vocational Education
- Nanyang Polytechnic
- Republic Polytechnic
- Sekolah Tinggi Teknologi Informasi NIIT
- Usman Institute of Technology
- AISSMS Institute of Information Technology

== Controversy ==
On October 26, 2016, Zhang Kai, CEO of ITHome issued an announcement stating he could no longer tolerate Alibaba Cloud's overselling and service interruption issues, and had migrated the hosting entirely to Baidu Cloud. Alibaba Cloud subsequently issued an apology letter, but indirectly mentioned that website performance should consider system architecture and avoid single-point design.

In June 2026, Anthropic told the US Senate Banking Committee that operators linked to Alibaba and its Qwen laboratory had run the largest distillation attack it had seen on its Claude models, using nearly 25,000 accounts for more than 28.8 million exchanges between April and June. In September 2026 a joint advisory from the FBI, NSA and CISA named Alibaba among six Chinese companies it said had extracted the capabilities of American AI models since late 2024; China's government called the accusations groundless.
