= Xiaomi MiMo =

Large language model developed by Xiaomi

- Developer: Xiaomi
- Release: 30 April 2025; 18 months ago
- Stable release: MiMo-V2.6-Pro / 22 September 2026; 58 days ago MiMo-V2.6-Flash / 22 September 2026; 58 days ago
- Platform: Cloud computing platforms
- Available in: English and other languages
- Type: Large language model
- License: Various; see § List of models
- Website: mimo.xiaomi.com mimo.mi.com

Xiaomi MiMo is a family of large language models (LLMs) developed by Xiaomi. It was initially released in April 2025 with the MiMo-7B model. Currently, MiMo is available for developers through API service. It is used as the key AI model in Xiaomi's "Human x Car x Home" ecosystem.

== Development ==
Xiaomi developed MiMo as a reasoning-focused language model. Its development team was led by Luo Fuli, who had previously worked at DeepSeek before joining Xiaomi in late 2025. The model was trained using multi-token prediction and reinforcement learning, with a particular emphasis on mathematical reasoning and code generation tasks. In March 2026, Xiaomi CEO Lei Jun announced that the company planned to invest at least US$8.7 billion in artificial intelligence over the following three years.

== Models ==
=== List of models ===
List of MiMo models
Model	Release date	Parameters	License	Knowledge cutoff	Ref.
MiMo-7B	30 April 2025	7 billion	MIT	Unknown	
MiMo-V2-Flash	17 December 2025	309 billion	MIT	December 2024	
MiMo-V2-Pro	18 March 2026	1 trillion	Proprietary	May 2025	
MiMo-V2-Omni	18 March 2026	Unknown	Proprietary	May 2025	
MiMo-V2-TTS	18 March 2026	Unknown	Proprietary	—N/a	
MiMo-V2.5	22 April 2026	310 billion	MIT	May 2025	
MiMo-V2.5-Pro	22 April 2026	1.02 trillion	MIT	May 2025	
MiMo-V2.6-Flash	22 September 2026	310B (15 billion active)	MIT		
MiMo-V2.6-Pro	22 September 2026	1.02 trillion (42 billion active)	MIT		

=== MiMo-7B ===
MiMo-7B is the first model of this LLM. The base model, MiMo-7B-Base, was pre-trained on approximately 25 trillion tokens using web pages, academic papers, books, and synthetic reasoning data. MiMo-7B-RL underwent supervised fine-tuning and reinforcement learning on 130,000 mathematics and code problems.

MiMo-7B-RL-0530 was released in May 2025. It scaled the fine-tuning dataset from 500,000 to 6 million instances and extended the RL window from 32,000 to 48,000 tokens and improved AIME 2024 scores from 68.2 to 80.1.

MiMo-VL-7B was a vision-language model combining a Vision Transformer encoder with the MiMo-7B backbone. It was trained in four stages consuming 2.4 trillion tokens. Its reinforcement learning variant used Mixed On-Policy Reinforcement Learning (MORL) which integrated reward signals across perception, grounding, and reasoning. Xiaomi also released MiMo-Audio-7B, an audio-language model for voice conversion, style transfer, and speech editing.

=== MiMo-V2-Flash ===
MiMo-V2-Flash was launched in December 2025. It is an open-sourced Mixture-of-experts model with 309 billion total parameters and 15 billion active parameters. It was trained on 27 trillion tokens using FP8 mixed precision. It used hybrid attention interleaving Sliding Window and Global Attention at a 5:1 ratio.

=== MiMo-V2-Pro ===
Xiaomi publicly introduced MiMo-V2-Pro on 18 March 2026. It has over 1 trillion total parameters, 42 billion active, and a 1-million-token context window. Before the official release, the model had appeared anonymously on OpenRouter under the codename "Hunter Alpha," where it drew substantial usage and topped daily charts for several days, according to Xiaomi and Reuters. During its listing on OpenRouter, the model reportedly processed over one trillion tokens in total usage. Xiaomi later said Hunter Alpha was an early internal test build of MiMo-V2-Pro, and Reuters reported that the model had been mistaken by some users for a possible DeepSeek system before Xiaomi confirmed its origin.

The model was released as a proprietary API product, and Luo Fuli stated that Xiaomi intended to open-source a variant at an unspecified future date. Xiaomi has partnered with several API web platforms to launch the model. All these websites initially offered a free trial of this model for a week, but due to the overwhelming response, Xiaomi later extended the free trial period of the model until 2 April 2026.

=== MiMo-V2-Omni ===
Alongside MiMo-V2-Pro, Xiaomi launched MiMo-V2-Omni on 18 March 2026. It handles image, video, audio, and text inputs. Before the official release, it was codenamed "Healer Alpha" in OpenRouter.

=== MiMo-V2-TTS ===
On the same date as the release of MiMo-V2-Pro and MiMo-V2-Omni, a Text-to-Speech model named MiMo-V2-TTS was released also. It is a speech synthesis model. It was trained on audio data, which makes it capable of emotional transitions, mid-sentence tone shifts, singing, and synthesis of regional dialects like Sichuan, Cantonese, Henan, and Taiwanese.

== Licensing ==
Xiaomi has used different licensing approaches for different models in the MiMo family. The MiMo-7B series and MiMo-V2-Flash were released as open-weight models. MiMo-V2-Flash was published under the MIT license with model weights and inference code available on Hugging Face.

MiMo-V2-Pro and MiMo-V2-Omni were released as proprietary models. It was accessible through Xiaomi's API platform and third-party API providers. Luo Fuli stated that Xiaomi intended to open-source a variant of MiMo-V2-Pro. Although, she did not specify any timeline. MiMo-V2-TTS was released as a proprietary model with no publicly available weights.

== See also ==
- Reasoning model
- List of large language models
