= Muntzing =

Design philosophy for electrical appliances

Muntzing is the practice and technique of reducing the components inside an electronic appliance to the minimum required for it to sufficiently function in most operating conditions, reducing design margins above minimum requirements toward zero. The term is named after the man who invented it, Earl "Madman" Muntz, a car and electronics salesman, who was not formally educated or trained in any science or engineering discipline.

In the 1940s and 1950s, television receivers were relatively new to the consumer market, and were more complex pieces of equipment than the radios which were then in popular use. TVs often contained upwards of 30 vacuum tubes, as well as transformers, rheostats, and other electronics. The consequence of high cost was high sales pricing, limiting potential for high-volume sales. Muntz expressed suspicion of complexity in circuit designs, and determined through simple trial and error that he could remove a significant number of electronic components from a circuit design and still end up with a monochrome TV that worked sufficiently well in urban areas, close to transmission towers where the broadcast signal was strong. He carried a pair of wire clippers, and when he felt that one of his builders was overengineering a circuit, he would begin snipping out some of the electronics components. When the TV stopped functioning, he would have the technician reinsert the last removed part. He would repeat the snipping in other portions of the circuit until he was satisfied in his simplification efforts, and then leave the TV as it was without further testing in more adverse conditions for signal reception.

As a result of removing tubes and greatly simplifying circuits originally designed to boost function in fringe areas (far from transmission towers), Muntz's sets generated less heat, thus diminishing overheating which was one of the most common reasons for failure in early sets. The reduced circuitry also reduced the power requirements; as a result, smaller power supplies could be used, so the sets weighed significantly less. Additionally, as the power supplies contained expensive copper, this further reduced cost.

== See also ==
- Comment (computer programming) § Debugging
- Cost engineering – Practice of regarding cost in engineering projects
- Electronic engineering – Sub-discipline of electrical engineering
- Lean manufacturing – Methodology used to improve production
- KISS principle – Design principle preferring simplicity
- Minimalism (computing) – Minimalist philosophies in hardware and software
- Design for lean manufacturing – Design process
- Muda (Japanese term) – Japanese concept in lean process thinking
- Value engineering – Engineering analysis that maximizes function-to-cost ratio
