= Riff =

Repeated refrain in music

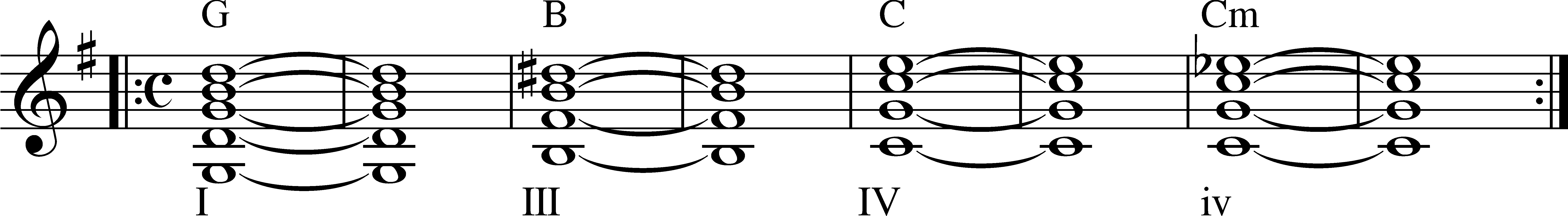
Ostinato from Radiohead's "Creep" features modal mixture, common tones between adjacent triads (B between G & B, C and G between C+ & C−), and an emphasis on subdominant harmony (IV = C in G major).

A riff is a short, repeated motif or figure in the melody or accompaniment of a musical composition. Riffs are most often found in various genres of rock music (including punk and heavy metal music), as well as Latin, funk, and jazz, although classical music is also sometimes based on a riff, as in Ravel's Boléro. Riffs can be as simple as a tenor saxophone honking a simple, catchy rhythmic figure, or as complex as the riff-based variations in the head arrangements played by the Count Basie Orchestra.

David Brackett (1999) defines riffs as "short melodic phrases", while Richard Middleton (1999) defines them as "short rhythmic, melodic, or harmonic figures repeated to form a structural framework". Author Rikky Rooksby states: "A riff is a short, repeated, memorable musical phrase, often pitched low on the guitar, which focuses much of the energy and excitement of a rock song."

BBC Radio 2, in compiling its list of 100 Greatest Guitar Riffs, defined a riff as the "main hook of a song" that often begins the song, and is "repeated throughout it, giving the song its distinctive voice".

Use of the term has extended to comedy, where riffing means the verbal exploration of a particular subject, thus moving the meaning away from the original jazz sense of a repeated figure that a soloist improvises over, to instead indicate the improvisation itself—improvising on a melody or progression as one would improvise on a subject by extending a singular thought, idea or inspiration into a bit, or routine.

== Etymology ==
The term riff entered musical slang in the 1920s and is used primarily in discussion of forms of rock music, heavy metal or jazz. One explanation holds that "most rock musicians use riff as a near-synonym for musical idea" (Middleton 1990, p. 125), but the etymology of the term is not clearly known.

Ian Anderson, in the documentary A World Without Beethoven, states (repeatedly) that "riff" is the abbreviation of "repeated motif". Other sources propose riff as an abbreviation for "rhythmic figure", "rhythm fragment", or "refrain".

== Usage in jazz, blues, and R&B ==
In jazz, blues and R&B, riffs are often used as the starting point for longer compositions. Count Basie's band used many riffs in the 1930s, like in "Jumping at the Woodside" and "One O Clock Jump". Charlie Parker used riffs on "Now's the Time" and "Buzzy". Oscar Pettiford's tune "Blues in the Closet" is a rifftune and so is Duke Ellington's tune "C Jam Blues". Blues guitarist John Lee Hooker used a riff learned from his stepfather for "Boogie Chillen" (1948), which in turn was adapted to many subsequent rock and roll songs.

The riff from Charlie Parker's bebop number "Now's the Time" (1945) re-emerged four years later as the R&B dance hit "The Hucklebuck". The verse of "The Hucklebuck", which was another riff, was "borrowed" from the Artie Matthews composition "Weary Blues". Glenn Miller's "In the Mood" had an earlier life as Wingy Manone's "Tar Paper Stomp". All these songs use twelve-bar blues riffs, and most of these riffs probably precede the examples given (Covach 2005, p. 71).

In classical music, individual musical phrases used as the basis of classical music pieces are called ostinatos or simply phrases. Contemporary jazz writers also use riff- or lick-like ostinatos in modal music and Latin jazz.

== Riff-driven ==
The term "riff-driven" is used to describe a piece of music that relies on a repeated instrumental riff as the basis of its most prominent melody, cadence, or (in some cases) leitmotif. Riff-driven songs are largely a product of jazz, blues, and post-blues era music (rock and pop). The musical goal of riff-driven songs is akin to the classical continuo effect, but raised to much higher importance (in fact, the repeated riff is used to anchor the song in the ears of the listener). The riff/continuo is brought to the forefront of the musical piece and often is the primary melody that remains in the listener's ears. A call and response often holds the song together, creating a "circular" rather than linear feel.

Who recorded the first riff-driven rock and roll song is contested, but very early examples include the playing by René Hall on Ritchie Valens' 1958 version of "La Bamba" (on a Danelectro six-string bass guitar), as well as Link Wray's 1958 instrumental record "Rumble".

A few examples of classic rock riff-driven songs are "Whole Lotta Love" and "Black Dog" by Led Zeppelin, "Day Tripper" by the Beatles, "Brown Sugar" and "(I Can't Get No) Satisfaction" by the Rolling Stones, "Smoke on the Water" by Deep Purple, "Back in Black" by AC/DC, "Smells Like Teen Spirit" by Nirvana, "Johnny B Goode" by Chuck Berry, "Back in the Saddle" by Aerosmith, and "You Really Got Me" by the Kinks.

== See also ==
- Fill
- Riffusion
- Vamp

== Sources ==
- Covach, John. "Form in Rock Music: A Primer", in Stein, Deborah (2005). Engaging Music: Essays in Music Analysis. New York: Oxford University Press. ISBN 0-19-517010-5.
- Homo, Bruce; Swiss, Thomas (1999). Form and Music: Key Terms in Popular Music and Culture. Malden, Massachusetts: Blackwell. ISBN 0-631-21263-9.
- Middleton, Richard (2002). Studying Popular Music. Philadelphia: Open University Press. ISBN 0-335-15275-9.
- Rooksby, Rikky (2002). Riffs: How to create and play great guitar riffs. San Francisco: Backbeat Books. ISBN 0-87930-710-2.
