= List of organizations supporting free software projects =

Many free software projects depend on donations and other support for maintenance and development. Some foundations provide funding or organizational assistance to these projects. Information about these foundations and their donors can help people understand how free software projects are supported.

== Foundations that support free software ==
Foundation	Mission	Annual Budget (million dollars)	Supported Projects	Notes
Apache Software Foundation			List of Apache Software Foundation projects	
Free Software Foundation			GCC, Binutils, ...	
Linux Foundation		8	Linux kernel, Node.js, Xen, ...	
Mozilla Foundation	keeping the Web open, free and accessible	329.5	Firefox, Thunderbird	
OpenBSD Foundation		0.25	OpenBSD, OpenSSH, OpenBGPD, OpenNTPD, OpenSMTPD, LibreSSL and Mandoc	
Software in the Public Interest			0 A.D., Aptosid, Arch Linux, Ardupilot, Chakra, Debian, Drizzle, FFmpeg, Fluxbox, Freedesktop.org, FreedomBox, Fresco, Gallery, Glucosio, GNUstep, GNU TeXmacs, Haskell, Jenkins, LibreOffice, MadWifi, MinGW, NTPsec, OFTC, Open Bioinformatics Foundation, Open Voting Foundation, OpenEmbedded, OpenVAS, OpenWrt, OpenZFS, Open64, OSUNIX, ...	
