= Neuralese =

Method of artificial intelligence reasoning

In artificial intelligence (AI) research, neuralese is a method where large language models (LLMs) perform intermediate reasoning steps in their high-dimensional latent space (vector embeddings) rather than outputting human-readable text tokens. While standard chain-of-thought reasoning forces a model to generate a sequence of words, neuralese allows the model to pass raw, continuous vectors between computational layers, creating a high-bandwidth, non-linguistic reasoning channel.

== See also ==
- Artificial intelligence safety
- Interpretability (machine learning)
