= NovelAI =

Online service for AI media creation

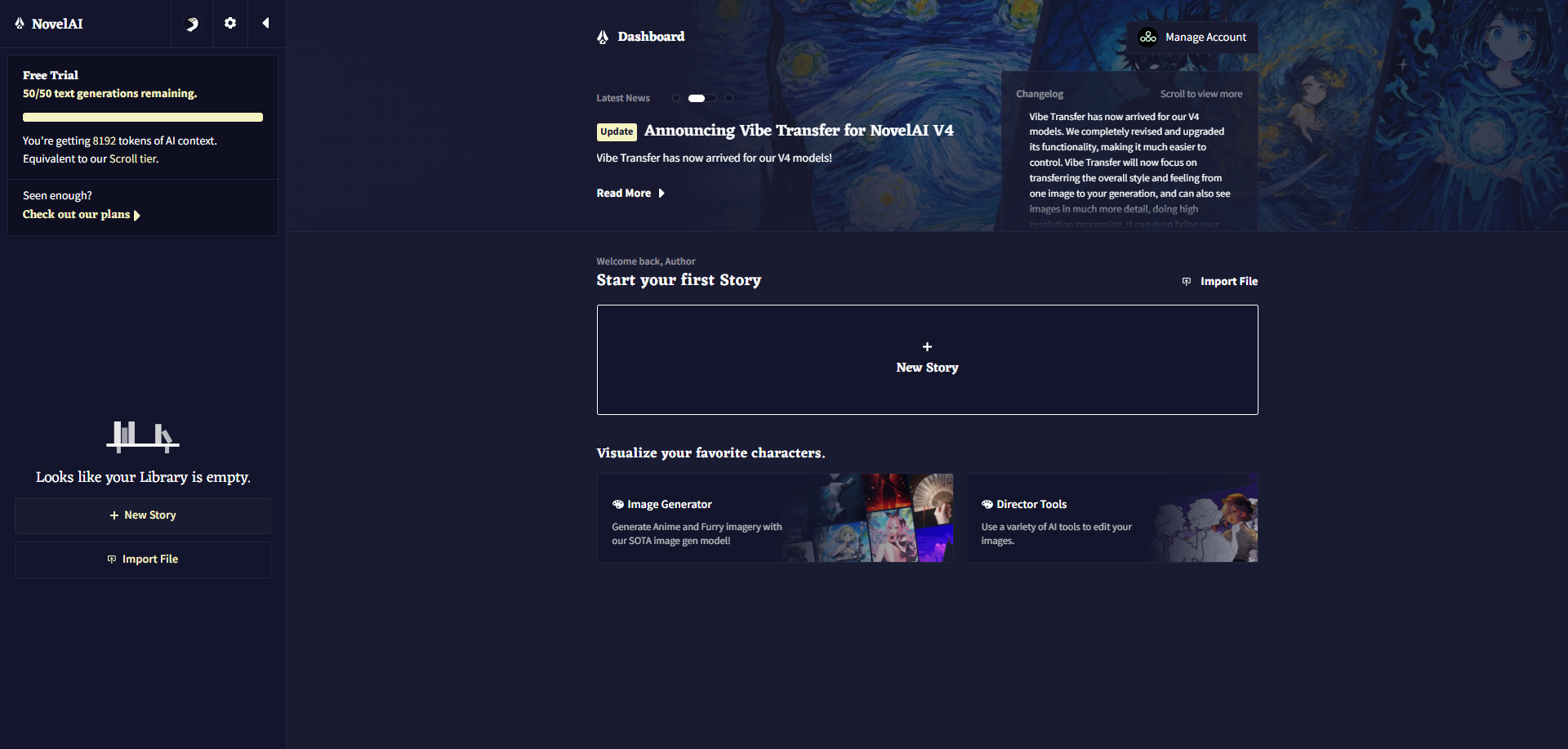
- Screenshot A screenshot of the main text generation page in May 2025
- Developer: Anlatan
- Initial release: 2021
- Type: Text-generation model, text-to-image model
- License: Proprietary
- Website: novelai.net

NovelAI is an online cloud-based, SaaS model, and a paid subscription service for AI-assisted storywriting and text-to-image synthesis, originally launched in beta on June 15, 2021, with the image generation feature being implemented later on October 3, 2022. NovelAI is owned and operated by Anlatan, which is headquartered in Wilmington, Delaware.

== Features ==
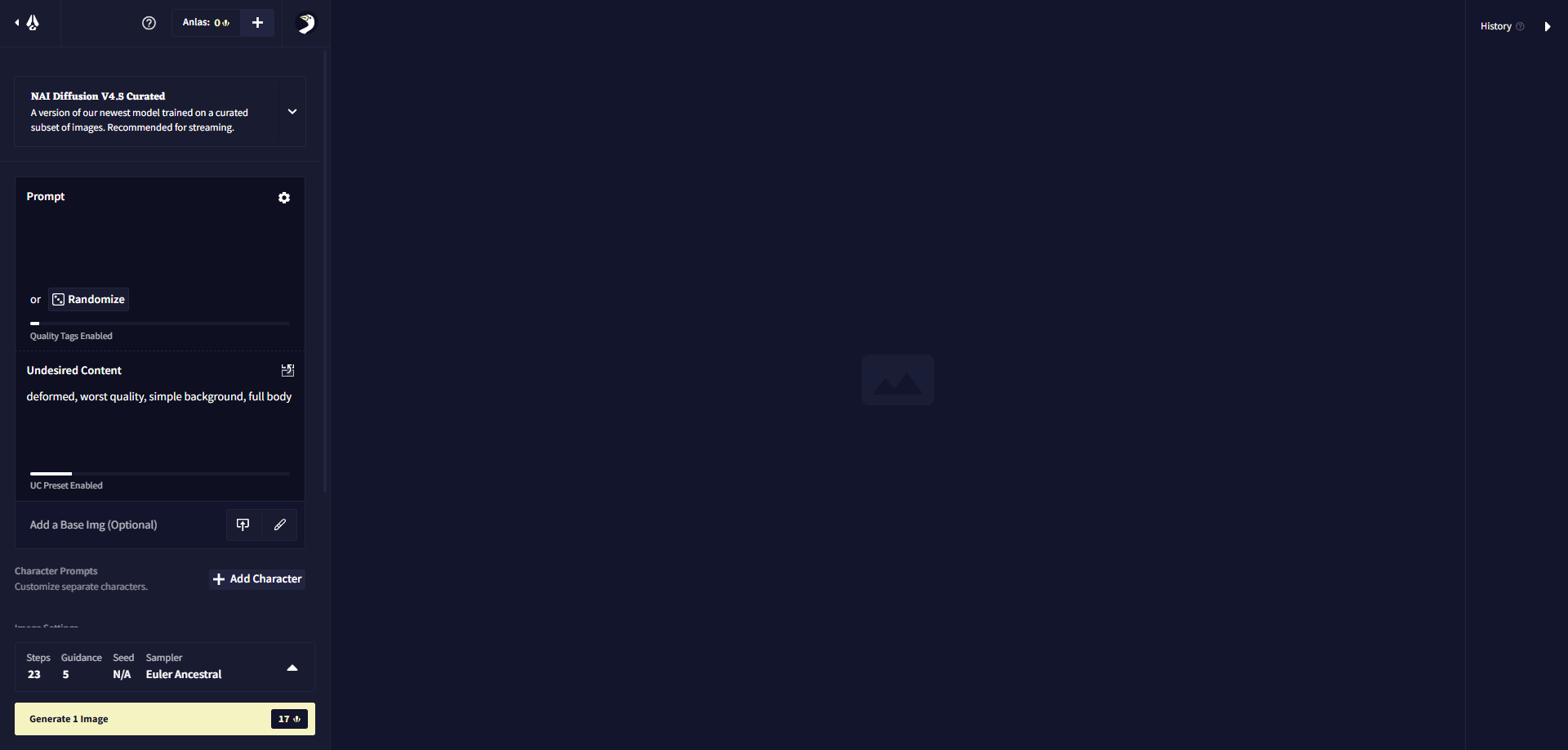
A screenshot of the main image generation page

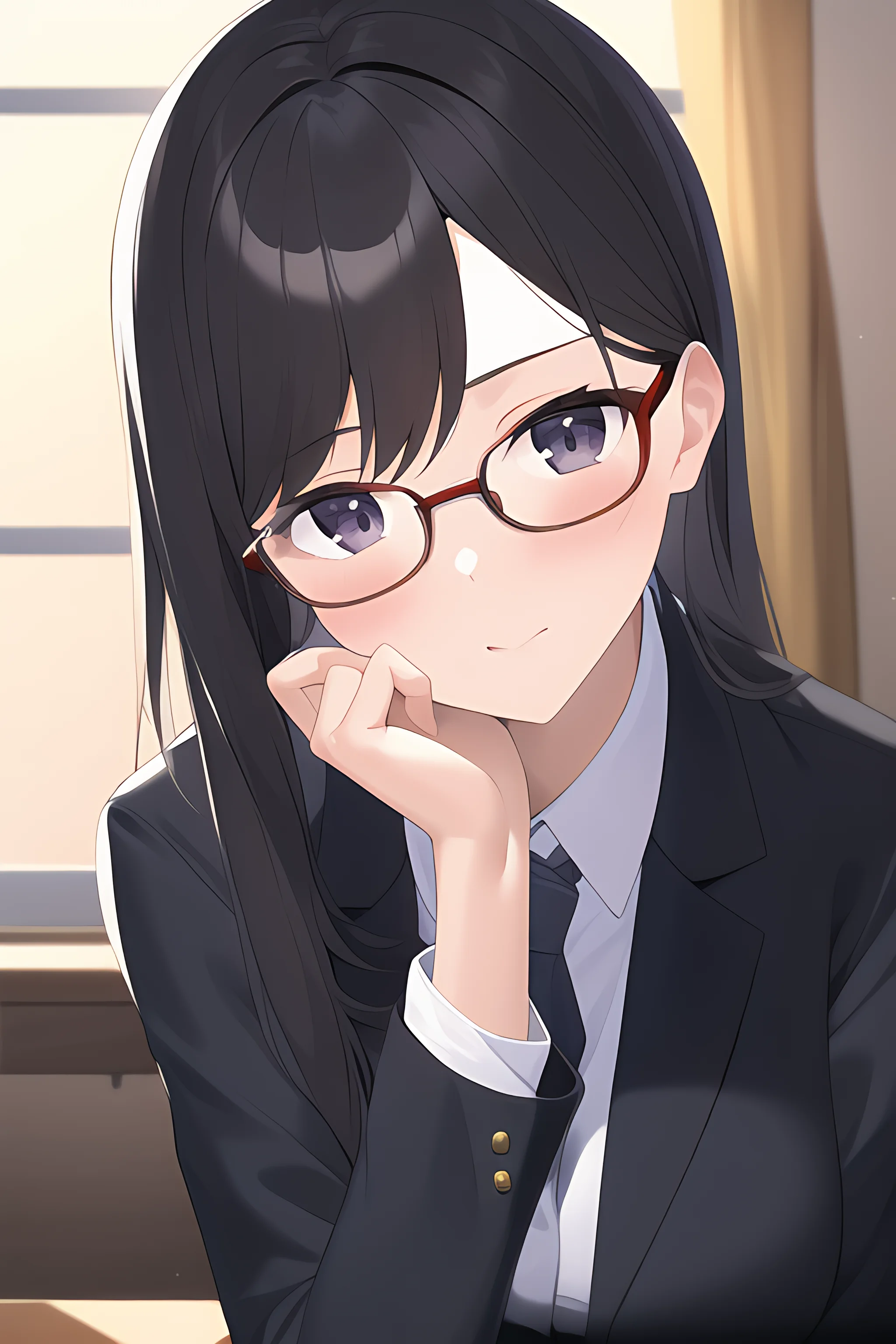
An image generated by NovelAI based on the text prompt "Girl, impressionism, (faint light), looking at hand, business suit, Rectangular glasses"

NovelAI uses GPT-based large language models (LLMs) to generate storywriting and prose. It has several models, such as Calliope, Sigurd, Euterpe, Krake, and Genji, with Genji being a Japanese-language model. The service also offers encrypted servers and customizable editors.

For AI art generation, which generates images from text prompts, NovelAI uses a custom version of the source-available Stable Diffusion text-to-image diffusion model called NovelAI Diffusion, which is trained on a Danbooru-based dataset.

NovelAI is also capable of generating a new image based on an existing image. The NovelAI terms of service states that all generated content belongs to the user, regardless if the user is an individual or a corporation. Anlatan states that generated images are not stored locally on their servers.

== History ==
On April 28, 2021, Anlatan officially launched NovelAI.

On June 15, 2021, Anlatan released their finetuned GPT-Neo-2.7B model from EleutherAI named Calliope, after the Greek Muses. A day later, they released their Opus-exclusive GPT-J-6B finetuned model named Sigurd, after the Norse/Germanic hero.

On March 21, 2023, Nvidia and CoreWeave announced Anlatan being one of the first CoreWeave customers to deploy NVIDIA's H100 Tensor Core GPUs for new LLM model inferencing and training.

On April 1, 2023, Anlatan added ControlNet features to their text-to-image NovelAI Diffusion model.

On May 16, 2023, Anlatan announced that they named their H100 cluster Shoggy, a reference to H.P. Lovecraft's Shoggoths, which was used to pre-train an undisclosed 8192 token context LLM in-house model.

== Reception and controversy ==
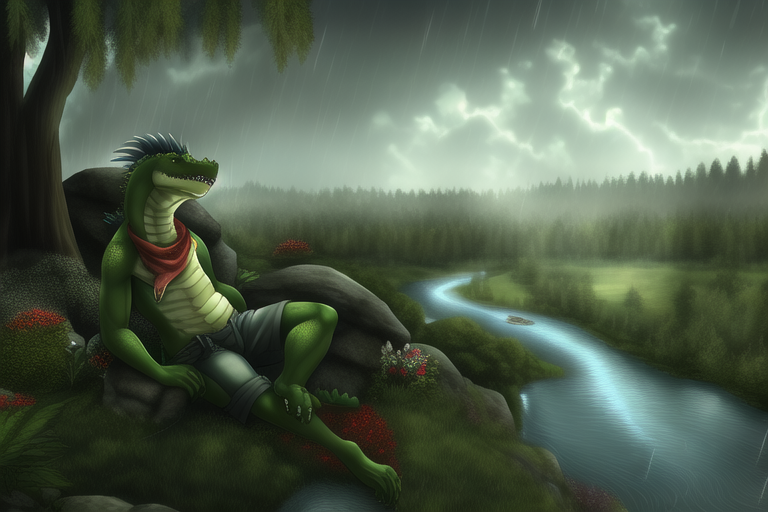
Art generated by NovelAI's furry diffusion model, depicting a dragon in a forest

Following the implementation of image generation, NovelAI became a widely-discussed topic in Japan, with some online commentators noting that its image synthesis features are very adept at producing close impressions of anime characters, including lolicon and shotacon imagery, while others have expressed concern that it is a paid service reliant on a diffusion model, while the original machine learning training data consists of images used without the consent of the original artists. Attorney Kosuke Terauchi notes that, since a revision of the law in 2018, it is no longer illegal in Japan for machine learning models to scrape copyrighted content from the internet to use as training data; meanwhile, in the United States where NovelAI is based, there is no specific legal framework which regulates machine learning, and thus the fair use doctrine of US copyright law applies instead. Danbooru has posted an official statement in regards to NovelAI's use of the site's content for AI training, expressing that Danbooru is not affiliated with NovelAI, and does not endorse nor condone NovelAI's use of artists' artworks for machine learning.

FayerWayer described NovelAI as a service capable of generating hentai. Manga artist Izumi Ū commented that while the manga style art generated by NovelAI is highly accurate, there are still imperfections in the output, although he views these as human-like in a favourable light nonetheless.

In response to the topic of NovelAI, Narugami, founder of the Japanese freelance artist commissioning website Skeb, stated on October 5, 2022 that the use of AI image generation is prohibited on the platform since 2018. Illustrations using NovelAI have been posted on social media and illustration posting sites, and by October 13, 2,111 works tagged with #NovelAI were posted on Pixiv. Pixiv has stated that it is not considering a complete elimination of creations that use AI, though it requires AI-generated posts to be marked as such and allows users to filter them out.

== Incidents ==
On October 6, 2022, NovelAI experienced a data breach where its software's source code was leaked.

== See also ==
- AI Dungeon
- CHAI
- Character.ai
- DALL-E
- DreamBooth
- Midjourney
- Replika
- Stable Diffusion
