= Gallery software =

Application software

Gallery software is software that helps the user publish or share photos, pictures, videos or other digital media. Most galleries are located on Web servers, where users are allowed to register and publish their pictures.

Gallery software usually features automatic image resizing, allows digital media be categorized into sets, and allows comments.

== Types ==
Early digital media publishing and sharing was done with imageboards. The boards are by topics, sometimes called "chan". Each discussion in a "chan" are started with a piece of digital media, and follow-up discussions can contain another piece too. Examples of such software are Futallaby and Danbooru.

Traditionally, galleries are managed. An administrator maintains a set of or hierarchy of albums. The users can upload their digital media in one of the existing albums defined by an administrator, or create their own albums. The users with sufficient permission can re-categorise the digital media others uploaded. Often, the site's administrator can define which album the users are allowed to categorise their media into, or delete other user's content. Examples are open source galleries Coppermine, Gallery Project.

There are decentralised gallery software that does not have an administrator for managing contents. Pinterest, Flickr and DeviantArt has been successful with this model. Open source gallery software MediaGoblin works in this way. Each user can create their own "collections", to categorise theirs or other users' media. However users cannot put media into other user's collections. Each user's category is separate. There is no centralised theme or hierarchy for the media.

== See also ==
- Imageboard
- Image sharing
- Image hosting service
