= Danbooru =

Anime-focused imageboard website

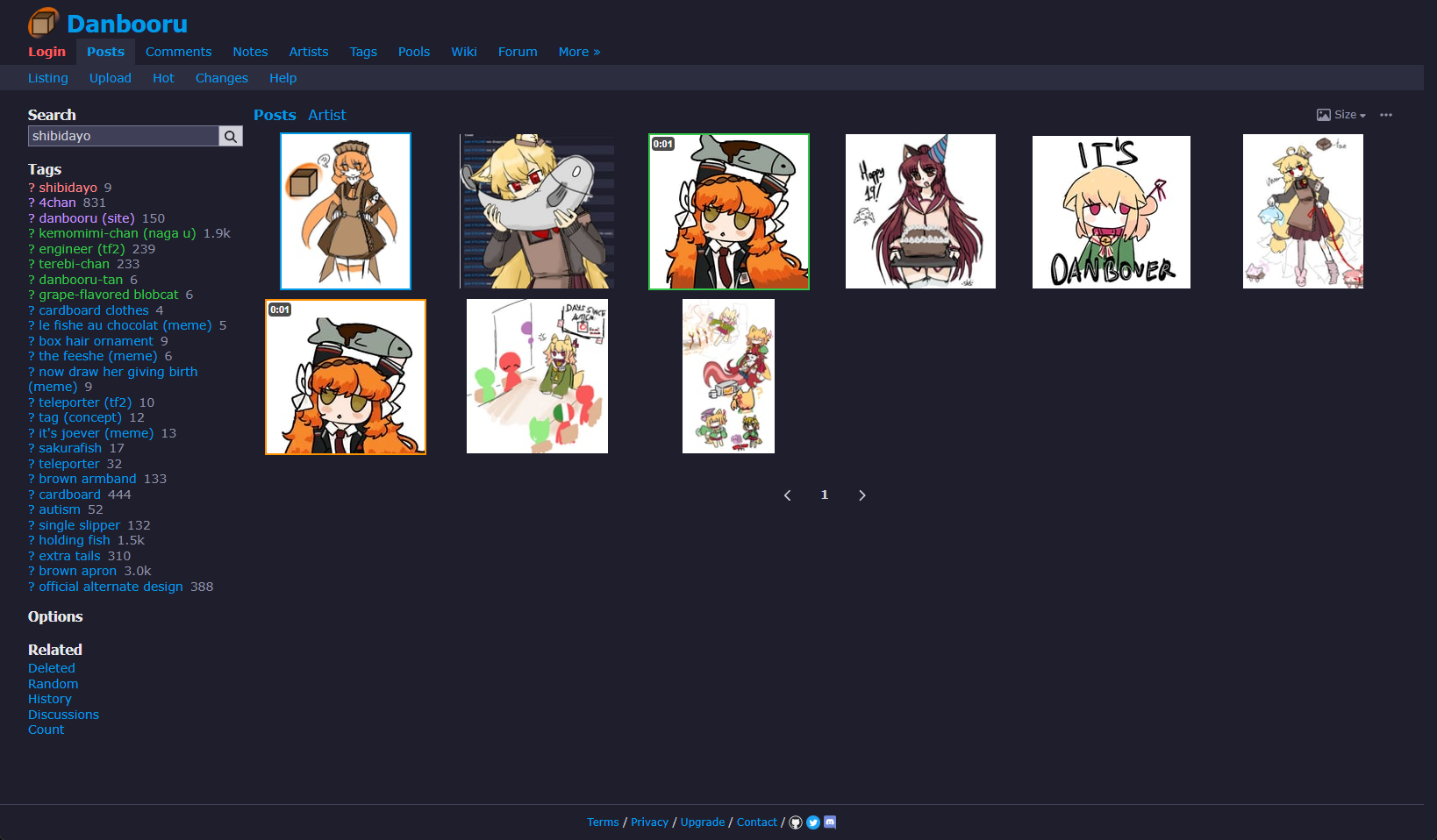
- Screenshot of Danbooru showing tag-based search results
- Website type: Imageboard, image hosting
- Available in: English
- Owner: Evazion
- Creator: Albert Yi
- Website: danbooru.donmai.us safebooru.donmai.us
- Commercial: No
- Registration: Optional
- Launched: May 25, 2005; 21 years ago
- Current status: Online

Danbooru
- Written in: Ruby
- Engine: Danbooru
- License: BSD 2-clause license
- Website: danbooru.donmai.us
- Repository: github.com/danbooru/danbooru

Danbooru is an English-language imageboard and image hosting website focused primarily on anime-style illustrations. It was launched in 2005 by a programmer known as "Albert" and is frequently described as one of the earliest and most influential "booru" style sites, using collaborative tags to organize images.

The site hosts over 10 million user-submitted images (as of December 2025), which are labeled with user-generated tags and content ratings. Danbooru has served as the basis for a large ecosystem of derivative software, related imageboards and machine learning datasets.

== History ==
Danbooru was created in 2005 as an imageboard for sharing and cataloging anime and manga-style artwork with a more structured metadata tagging system than traditional forums or boards. According to a later retrospective based on the site's Facebook page and early web archives, Danbooru launched on May 25, 2005, and had tens of thousands of images within its first year of operation. The website's name derives from the Japanese word danbōru (段ボール; lit. "corrugated cardboard"), and the logo is a corrugated cardboard box.

In March 2007, the site was temporarily taken offline by its administrator, who also released a copy of the database and the site's source code. This closure encouraged other developers to launch their own boards using the Danbooru codebase, leading to a rapid proliferation of so-called "booru"-style imageboards dedicated to particular fandoms or content ratings. Danbooru itself returned later in 2007 and has remained online since.

Over time, the site's codebase was extracted into a more general-purpose open-source project and moved to public version control hosting, where it has been maintained and extended as a Ruby on Rails application. Danbooru's operators have also periodically released database exports and have allowed external mirrors for research and archival purposes.

In the 2010s and 2020s, Danbooru became widely referenced in online culture and in technical literature as the archetypal anime imageboard, with numerous forks of the website being built on similar tagging conventions.

On November 4, 2026, the website was taken down following a security breach in which a user uploaded a malicious flash video that contained a Javascript worm that collected the IP addresses of anyone who viewed the post. Danbooru staff believe that the attack affected any users who viewed flash posts within a five minute window and state that the security issue itself has since been fixed. In the following week the website underwent a full audit and rebuild of the website's backend, and came back online on November 11.

== Software ==
The Danbooru website runs on a custom imageboard engine written in Ruby on Rails and released as free and open-source software under a BSD 2-clause license. The software provides features typical of "booru" platforms, including:

- Uploading and hosting of raster images, animations and video.
- A collaborative tagging interface where users can add, edit and imply tags.
- Tag type categorization (such as copyright, character, artist, general content and meta tags).
- Rating fields distinguishing general, sensitive, questionable and explicit content.
- A wiki system for documenting tags, series, characters and site-specific conventions.
- User accounts, favorites, comments and voting.
- A forum for users to collaborate.
- "Pools", which allow ordered sequences or thematic collections of images.

=== Forks ===
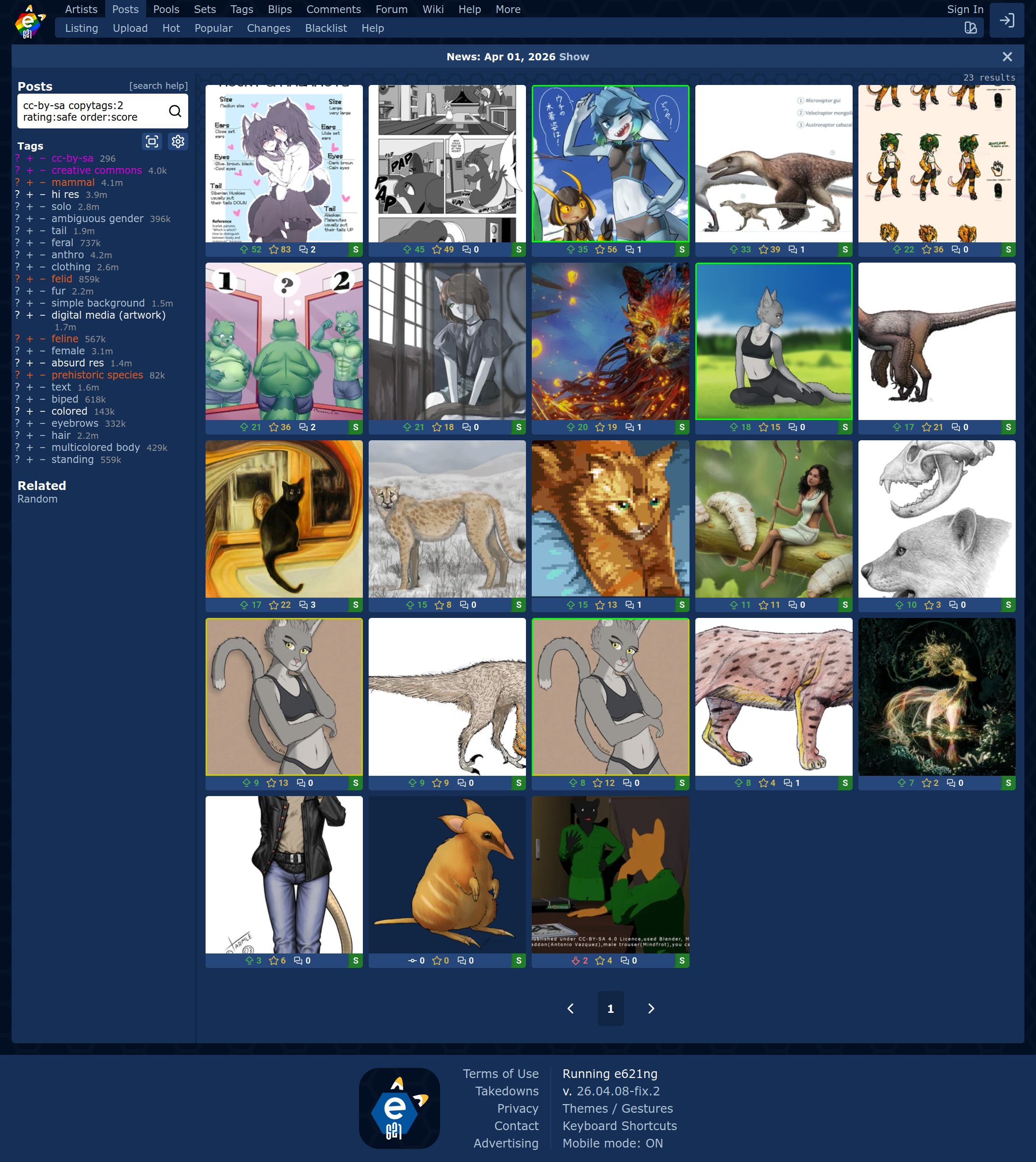
e621, a popular Danbooru fork

Because the codebase is openly licensed, it has been forked or adapted by numerous other imageboard projects, and is often cited in documentation for imageboard search engines and third-party taggers. Notable forks include furry fandom-centred imageboard e621.

== Tagging and content ==
Danbooru is organized around a detailed, user-maintained tag system. Tags are grouped into broad categories such as artists, characters, copyrights (franchises or works), general descriptive tags and meta information such as medium or resolution. This structure forms a folksonomy that allows users to search for highly specific combinations of attributes, such as particular characters, clothing, poses or visual motifs.

Images are also given an explicitness rating, classified as general, sensitive, questionable or explicit, which reflects the presence of nudity, sexual themes or other potentially sensitive material such as violence or drug use. In contrast to some other platforms, Danbooru does not attempt to prohibit such material outright. Instead, the website relies on tagging and ratings so that users and downstream tools can filter content according to their preferences. Options include using the Safebooru variant of the website, using the blacklist function, or toggling the safe mode which can be found under their account settings.

The site enforces submission guidelines intended to maintain a minimum level of technical quality. Low-resolution or heavily compressed images, near-duplicates and certain kinds of prohibited content may be rejected or removed by moderators, and the tagging community is encouraged to correct metadata and add translations where appropriate. Posts that aren't approved by moderators under a certain timescale will also be deleted. Deleted content may still be viewed by accessing the "deleted" hyperlink under the "Related" section to the left of the main menu, tags are still applied to deleted content so users may search for deleted posts of a certain tag.

== Use in datasets and machine learning ==
Due to its scale and detailed annotations, Danbooru has been widely used as a source for datasets in computer vision and generative modeling research. The Danbooru20xx series of datasets (including Danbooru2017 and Danbooru2021) are static snapshots of the site's content and metadata prepared for machine learning, comprising millions of images with hundreds of millions of tags.

The Danbooru2021 release, for example, includes more than 4.9 million images with roughly 162 million tag annotations, covering uploads from 2005 to the end of 2021. These datasets have been used to train models for multi-label image classification, automatic tagging, anime-style face detection and segmentation, and image generation, among other tasks. Software engineer Yuya Hanai stated that Danbooru is an excellent dataset for training image data.

Later work has extended the concept to larger derivatives such as "Danbooru2023" and related WebP-based releases, which continue to be cited in research on diffusion models and text-to-image systems that specialize in anime-style artwork.

NovelAI, an AI image generation platform, uses a custom version of the Stable Diffusion text-to-image diffusion model called NovelAI Diffusion, which is reported to be trained on a Danbooru-based dataset.

== Reception and influence ==
Danbooru is widely described in secondary sources as a foundational or "canonical" anime imageboard, notable for its emphasis on high-quality submissions and detailed tagging. The site's tagging conventions, rating scheme and API have been emulated by numerous subsequent imageboards and related tools, and have influenced how anime and fan-art communities organize visual content online.

In addition to its role in online fandom, Danbooru has been used as a case study in discussions of collaborative content curation, crowdsourced annotation and the ethics of large-scale web scraping for machine learning. Academic and technical articles frequently cite Danbooru both as an example of a user-generated tagging system and as a source of training data for models that operate on illustration-style images.

== See also ==
- Anime and manga fandom – Fan community
- Pixiv – Japanese online artist community
- Booru – Type of Internet forum
