= Riffusion =

Music-generating machine learning model

Riffusion (now Producer AI)
- Developers: Seth Forsgren; Hayk Martiros
- Release: December 15, 2022
- Written in: Python
- Type: Text-to-image model
- License: MIT License
- Website: riffusion.com
- Repository: github.com/hmartiro/riffusion-inference

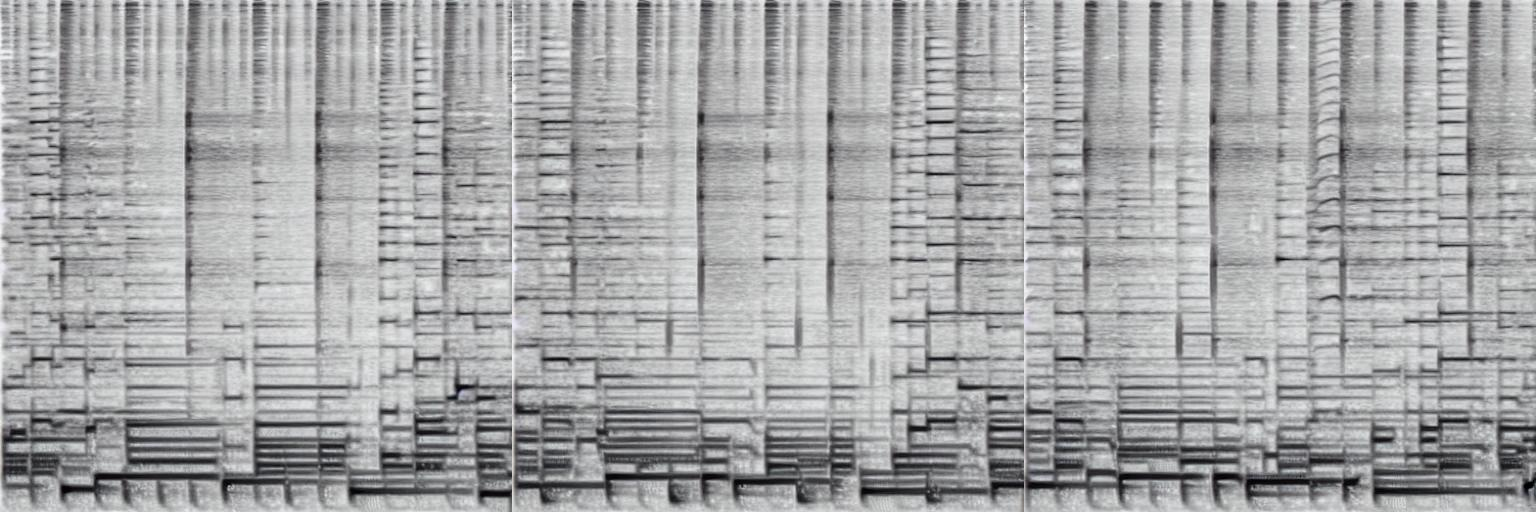
Generated spectrogram from the prompt "bossa nova with electric guitar" (top), and the resulting audio after conversion (bottom)

Riffusion is a neural network, designed by Seth Forsgren and Hayk Martiros, that generates music using images of sound rather than audio.

The resulting music has been described as "de otro mundo" (otherworldly), although unlikely to replace man-made music. The model was made available on December 15, 2022, with the code also freely available on GitHub.

The first version of Riffusion was created as a fine-tuning of Stable Diffusion, an existing open-source model for generating images from text prompts, on spectrograms, resulting in a model which used text prompts to generate image files which could then be put through an inverse Fourier transform and converted into audio files. While these files were only several seconds long, the model could also use latent space between outputs to interpolate different files together (using the img2img capabilities of SD). It was one of many models derived from Stable Diffusion.

In December 2022, Mubert similarly used Stable Diffusion to turn descriptive text into music loops. In January 2023, Google published a paper on their own text-to-music generator called MusicLM.

Forsgren and Martiros formed a startup, also called Riffusion, and raised $4 million in venture capital funding in October 2023.
