= DreamBooth =

Deep learning generation model

DreamBooth is a deep learning generation model used to personalize existing text-to-image models by fine-tuning. It was developed by researchers from Google Research and Boston University in 2022. Originally developed using Google's own Imagen text-to-image model, DreamBooth implementations can be applied to other text-to-image models, where it can allow the model to generate more fine-tuned and personalized outputs after training on three to five images of a subject.

== Technology ==
Pretrained text-to-image diffusion models, while often capable of offering a diverse range of different image output types, lack the specificity required to generate images of lesser-known subjects, and are limited in their ability to render known subjects in different situations and contexts. The methodology used to run implementations of DreamBooth involves the fine-tuning the full UNet component of the diffusion model using a few images (usually 3--5) depicting a specific subject. Images are paired with text prompts that contain the name of the class the subject belongs to, plus a unique identifier. As an example, a photograph of a [Nissan R34 GTR] car, with car being the class); a class-specific prior preservation loss is applied to encourage the model to generate diverse instances of the subject based on what the model is already trained on for the original class. Pairs of low-resolution and high-resolution images taken from the set of input images are used to fine-tune the super-resolution components, allowing the minute details of the subject to be maintained.

== Usage ==
DreamBooth can be used to fine-tune models such as Stable Diffusion, where it may alleviate a common shortcoming of Stable Diffusion not being able to adequately generate images of specific individual people. Such a use case is quite VRAM intensive, however, and thus cost-prohibitive for hobbyist users. The Stable Diffusion adaptation of DreamBooth in particular is released as a free and open-source project based on the technology outlined by the original paper published by Ruiz et al. in 2022. Concerns have been raised regarding the ability for bad actors to utilise DreamBooth to generate misleading images for malicious purposes, and that its open-source nature allows anyone to utilise or even make improvements to the technology. In addition, artists have expressed their apprehension regarding the ethics of using DreamBooth to train model checkpoints that are specifically aimed at imitating specific art styles associated with human artists; one such critic is Hollie Mengert, an illustrator for Disney and Penguin Random House who has had her art style trained into a checkpoint model via DreamBooth and shared online, without her consent.
