= Midjourney, Inc. =

US artificial intelligence company

- Type: Private
- Industry: Artificial intelligence
- Founded: 2021; 5 years ago
- Founders: David Holz
- Headquarters: San Francisco, California
- Area served: Worldwide
- Products: Midjourney
- Number of employees: 60
- Website: midjourney.com

Midjourney, Inc. is an American artificial intelligence company, known for its image-generation model, Midjourney. It was founded in 2021 San Francisco, California, by David Holz, previously a co-founder of Leap Motion. Holz told The Register in August 2022 that the company was already profitable.

The company calls itself an "independent research lab".

== Image generation model ==
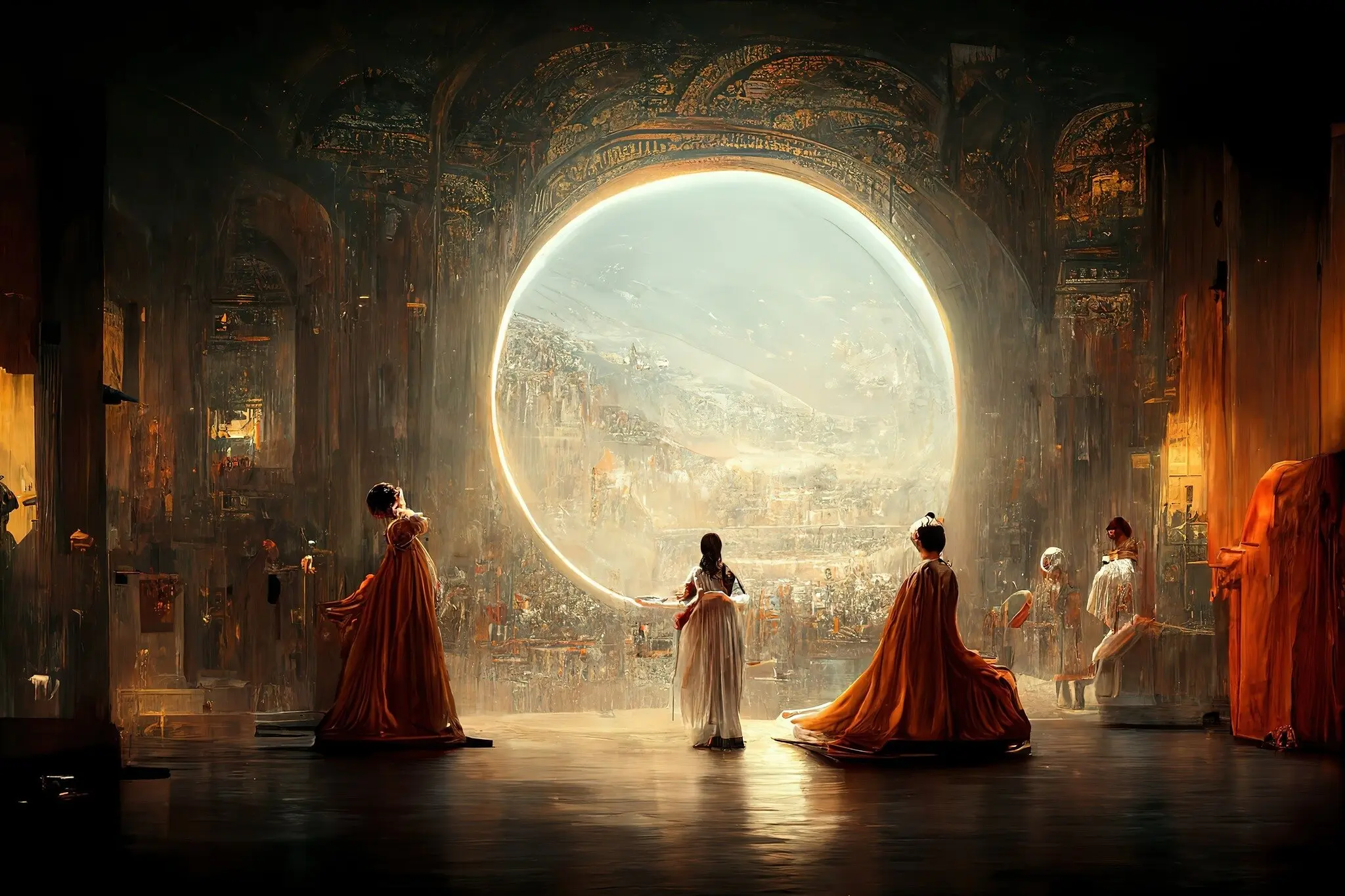
Théâtre D'opéra Spatial, a Midjourney image that won first prize in a digital art competition

The Midjourney image generation model entered open beta on July 12, 2022.

Midjourney generates images from natural language descriptions, called prompts, similar to OpenAI's DALL-E and Stability AI's Stable Diffusion.

== Medical imaging project ==
In June 2026, Midjourney announced Midjourney Medical, a division developing a proposed full-body ultrasound system called Midjourney Scanner that scans users in water using a ring of sensors. The company said the system would produce body-composition scans in about 60 seconds and planned a San Francisco spa location for 2027.
