= Shy Girl =

2025 horror novel

- Cover of the UK edition
- Author: Mia Ballard
- Genre: Horror literature
- Publisher: Hachette Book Group
- Publication date: 2025
- Publication place: United Kingdom

Shy Girl is a horror novel initially self-published in February 2025 by Mia Ballard. Publishing rights for the book were acquired by Hachette Book Group, which released the book in the United Kingdom in November 2025 and planned to publish it in the United States in 2026. Its US release was cancelled and its UK release was discontinued after it faced accusations of being created with generative AI. Ballard denied having personally used AI in the book's writing, claiming that a freelance editor may have introduced AI-generated changes to the entirety of the text. She also stated that she would take legal action against the editor.

== Plot ==
Gia, an unemployed and depressed young woman struggling with severe obsessive–compulsive disorder (OCD), faces imminent eviction from her apartment. Out of financial desperation, she signs up for a sugar dating website and meets Nathan, an affluent and enigmatic older man. After a few dates, Nathan makes an unconventional proposal: he will clear all of her debts and pay her $2,400 a week if she agrees to act as his devoted pet dog for eight hours a day. Overwhelmed by financial pressure, Gia reluctantly accepts the offer.

At Nathan's secluded house, Gia is subjected to strict rules: she must crawl on all fours, eat dog food, respond only by barking, and submit to physical punishment if she breaks character or uses her human name. During her visits, she notices hidden cameras and realizes Nathan is broadcasting her captivity on fetish websites. She also briefly encounters "Cupcake", another woman whom Nathan previously forced into submission and is now discarding. Eventually, Nathan breaks their agreement and imprisons Gia permanently in a camera-rigged cell he calls the "Pink Room", renaming her "Shy Girl".

Isolated from the outside world for years, Gia suffers severe psychological trauma and physical abuse. Over time, her human identity erodes, and her body undergoes a grotesque physical metamorphosis, developing fur, claws, and fangs. After being impregnated by Nathan, she gives birth to a malformed infant with canine features and devours it in front of him, demonstrating that she has become entirely feral.

Unnerved by her transformation, Nathan attempts to end the arrangement and release her, offering her cash and her old belongings. Embracing her new animalistic state, Gia rejects the money and brutally mauls Nathan, killing him by tearing open his throat. Cupcake, who reveals she was emotionally tethered to Nathan for over a decade, allows Gia to escape. Rejecting human clothes, money, and vehicle keys, Gia flees on all fours into the surrounding wilderness, fully abandoning her human identity.

== Publication and cancellation ==
Shy Girl was first self-published online by Mia Ballard in February 2025. Marketing material described the book as a "buzzy BookTok sensation" and "bloody and unforgiving". The self-published edition of the book was highly successful and had over 4,900 ratings on Goodreads and an average score of 3.52 stars. In an interview, Ballard described her writing style as lyrical, feverish, and introspective, and stated she was more interested in "what it feels like to live inside a body" than in plot-driven storylines.

Publishing rights were acquired by Hachette Book Group and it was published by its Wildfire imprint in the United Kingdom in November 2025. By March 2026, the book had sold 1,800 copies in the United Kingdom. A US release was planned for 2026 by the imprint Orbit Books.

After the British publication, critics and readers began to make claims that the book appeared to have been written by generative AI. A January 2026 post on Reddit claimed that the book had many of the hallmarks of having been written with a large language model, and stated that it was "repulsive" that the book was accepted by Hachette. A two-and-a-half-hour video essay covering the book, created by channel frankie's shelf and titled "i'm pretty sure this book is ai slop", received 1.2 million views on YouTube by March 2026.

In response, Hachette Book Group announced in March 2026 that it would cancel the book's US publication and discontinue its UK publication. It told The Wall Street Journal that it had made "a lengthy investigation" before deciding to cancel the book. Ballard told The New York Times that she had not used AI when writing the book, but that AI-generated elements were added by a freelance editor without her knowledge. She also stated that she could not elaborate on her claim because she was pursuing legal action against the editor. Writer Andrea Bartz opined that the situation "raises many concerns about trust, authenticity and publishing's readiness for a new, A.I.-assisted world", but that "readers made it abundantly clear they want books by humans, not machines".

In an op-ed criticizing Pangram's reliability, James Taranto, editorial features editor at The Wall Street Journal, revealed that independent blogger Audrey Hinson had discovered Pangram's report on Shy Girl relied on a copy of the book uploaded to OceanofPDF, which the Authors Guild had flagged as "one of the most notorious digital ebook piracy sites". Taranto concluded Ballard could potentially sue her accusers for "copyright violation" in addition to "defamation and tortious interference", and questioned whether Pangram was sincere about "protect(ing) editorial integrity".

== See also ==
- Daggermouth (novel)
- Alice and Sparkle
- Zarya of the Dawn
