= Zarya of the Dawn =

AI-illustrated comic book

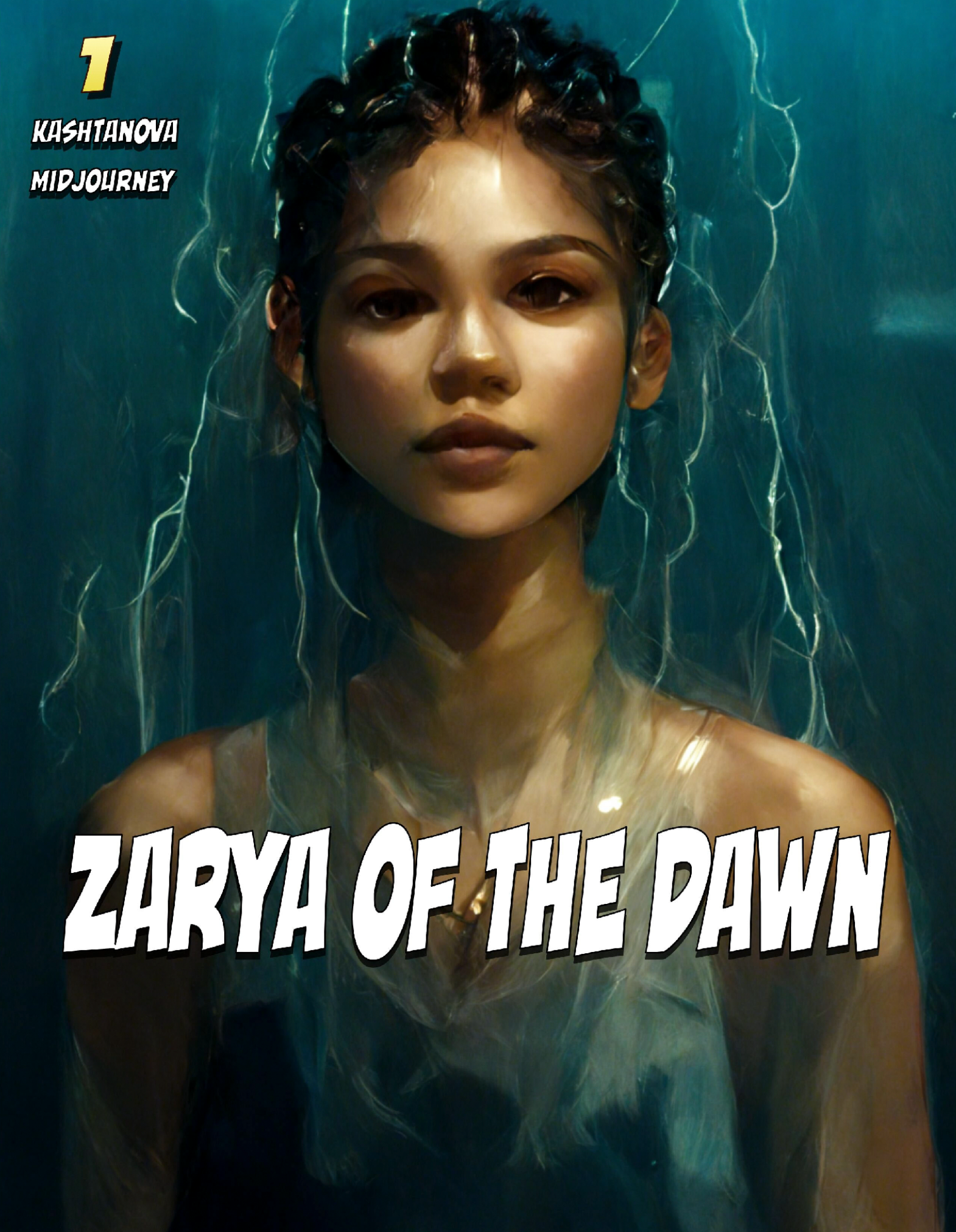

Creative team
- Written by: Kris Kashtanova
- Artist: Midjourney

Zarya of the Dawn is a short comic book written by Kris Kashtanova and illustrated entirely with the artificial intelligence software Midjourney, which resulted in a copyright dispute.

== Plot ==
Zarya awakens in an abandoned New York City with no memories. A postcard from a person named Rusty falls out of their pocket, allowing them to remember their name and home address. After returning home and getting new clothes, Zarya meets Raya, their "inter-world assistant", who tells Zarya that a mental health crisis in 2023 led to the almost complete destruction of life on Earth. Raya then takes Zarya to Zatura World, the world of acceptance. There, Zarya meets a mysterious woman and learns to accept their feelings. When they return to Central Park, it is covered in greenhouses. Zarya remarks that "acceptance is the first step of letting go".

== Copyright dispute ==
In September 2022, Kashtanova applied for the comic's copyright protection with the United States Copyright Office, but they did not disclose that the illustrations were created using Midjourney, an artificial intelligence image generator. The comic was granted copyright protection, but the Copyright Office initiated a proceeding to revoke the protection of the artwork after discovering the fact. The artwork's copyright protection was revoked in February 2023, and the Copyright Office explained that only human-created works can receive protection. Although the images themselves are not protected by copyright, the arrangement of the images and the text and story of the book are, as they are the creative work of Kashtanova and not the artificial intelligence.

== See also ==
- Artificial intelligence and copyright
- Shy Girl
- Alice and Sparkle
