= Ideogram (text-to-image model) =

Image-generating machine learning model

- Example of image generated by Ideogram 4.5
- Developer: Ideogram
- Release: 29 August 2023; 3 years ago
- Stable release: Ideogram 4.6 / 19 November 2026; 3 days ago
- Type: Text-to-image model
- Website: ideogram.ai

Ideogram is a freemium text-to-image model developed by Ideogram, Inc. using deep learning methodologies to generate digital images from natural language descriptions known as prompts. The model is capable of generating legible text in the images compared to other text-to-image models.

== History ==
Ideogram was founded in 2022 by Mohammad Norouzi, William Chan, Chitwan Saharia, and Jonathan Ho to develop a better text-to-image model.

It was first released with its 0.1 model on August 22, 2023, after receiving $16.5 million in seed funding, which itself was led by Andreessen Horowitz and Index Ventures.

In February 2024, Ideogram raised $80 million after its 1.0 model release in the same year.

In August 2024, Ideogram released its 2.0 model. This model has several styles such as realistic, design, 3D, and anime and better capability in generating text.

In February 2025, Ideogram released 2a model. This model was designed for speed and optimized for graphics design and photography generation.

In March 2025, Ideogram released its 3.0 model. This model has improved realism and understanding of complex text layout, although like other generative AI models, it still struggles with ambigram creation.

On June 3, 2026, Ideogram released its 4.0 model. In contrast to its predecessors, it is open source under the Apache 2.0 license.

On September 30, 2026, Ideogram released its 4.5 model.
