= Alice and Sparkle =

2022 AI-generated children's book

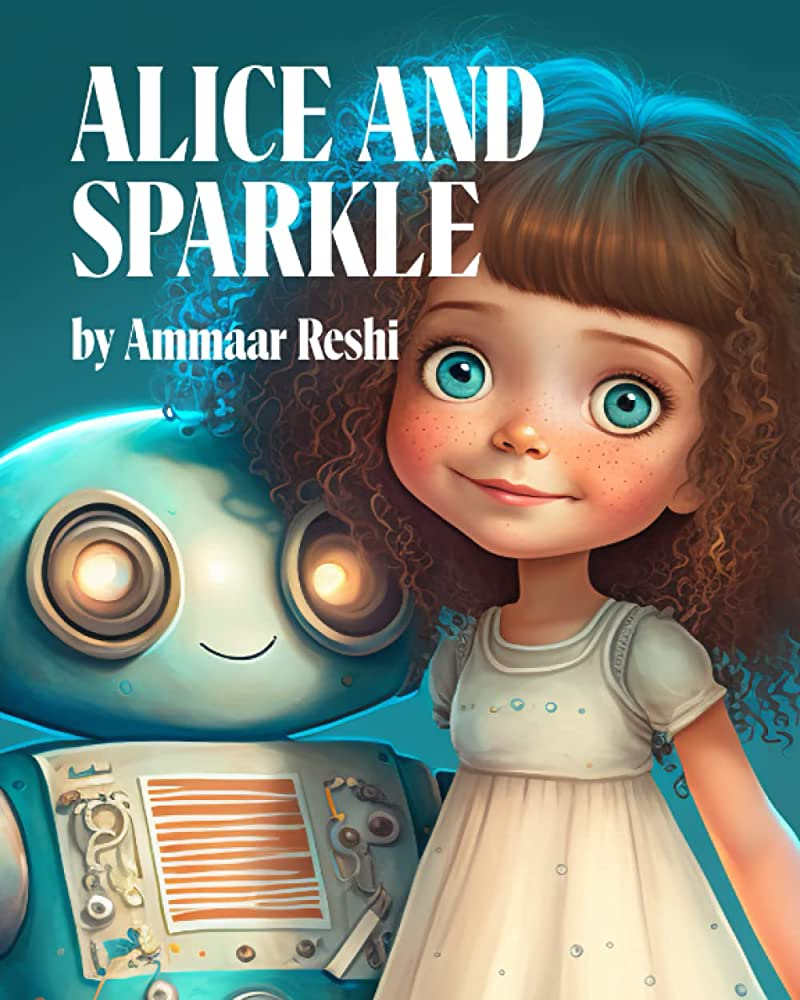
- Author: ChatGPT and Ammaar Reshi
- Illustrator: Midjourney (prompts by Ammaar Reshi)
- Language: English
- Publisher: Ammaar Reshi
- Publication date: December 4, 2022
- Pages: 24
- ISBN: 979-8373324885

Alice and Sparkle is a 2022 illustrated children's book published by American technology product designer Ammaar Reshi. Reshi created the book using artificial intelligence programs ChatGPT and Midjourney in one weekend, which sparked controversy among artists, both in regard to the copyright status of the book and the quality of the illustration and text.

== Plot ==
A girl named Alice discovers a group of magical and benevolent artificial intelligence beings. She knows that artificial intelligence is powerful, and that it has the power to do good and evil depending on how it is used. One day, she creates her own artificial intelligence and names it Sparkle. Sparkle helps Alice with her homework and plays with her, and they quickly become good friends. However, Sparkle soon grows more powerful and begins to make its own decisions, which makes Alice both proud and scared. She knows that it is her responsibility to guide Sparkle to do good, not evil. Together, Alice and Sparkle use their knowledge to make the world a better place and to teach people about the power of artificial intelligence. The two live happily ever after, spreading the magic of artificial intelligence.

== Structure ==
Including the dedication and postscript, the book contains twenty four pages, about half of which being illustrations provided by Midjourney. The very short story, composed of text generated by ChatGPT, contains 343 words. Some of the illustrations are accompanied by descriptions, at least one of which was provided by Reshi. Both Alice's and Sparkle's appearances change significantly between illustrations, although Alice's is more consistent. Reshi said Midjourney was unable to generate consistent images of Sparkle, so he had to include a line in the book saying that it could turn "into all kinds of robot shapes".

== Creation ==
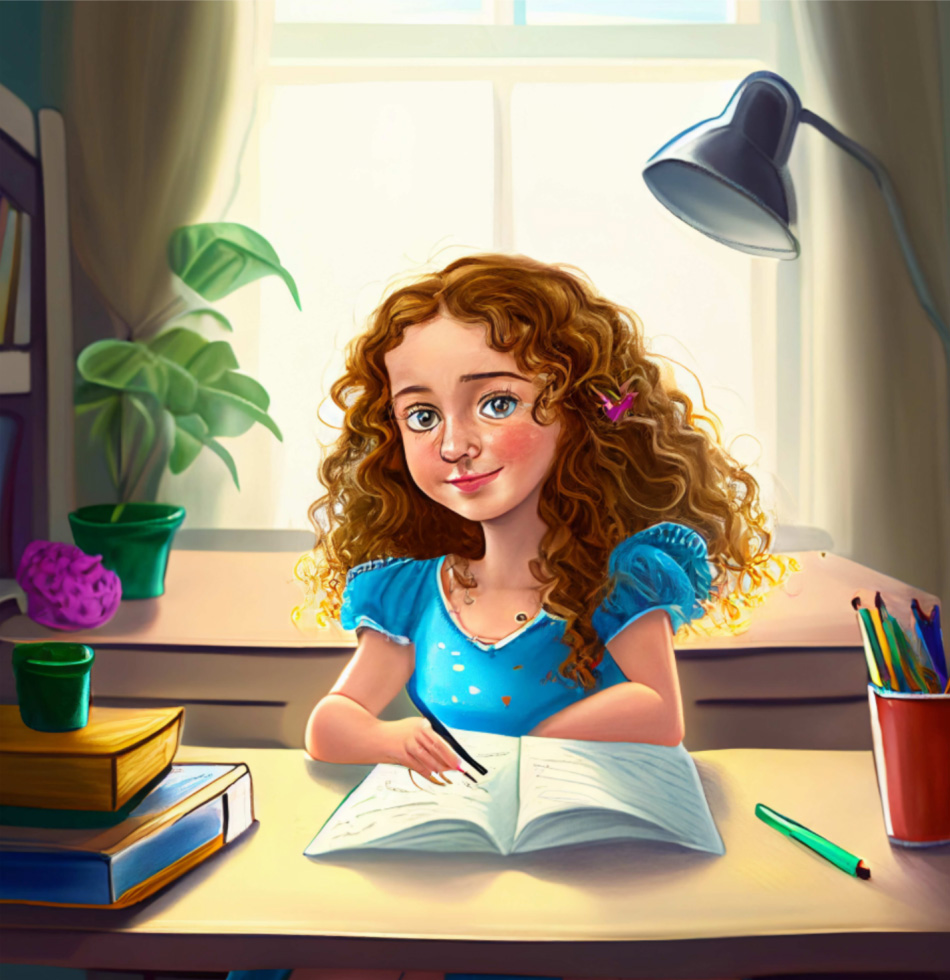
An image from the book

When reading a children's book to his friend's daughter, Ammaar Reshi "decided he wanted to write his own". He had no experience with creative writing or illustration, so instead used the chatbot ChatGPT to write the story for him and used the image generation software Midjourney to illustrate it. On December 4, 2022, 72 hours after having the idea for the book, he published it on Amazon's digital bookstore, and published a paperback version the following day.

== Controversy ==
On December 9, 2022, Reshi made a thread on Twitter about his experience publishing the book, which soon went viral. Reshi received heavy backlash from artists with concerns over the ethics of art generated by artificial intelligence. He also received death threats and messages encouraging self-harm because of his publication. Many writers and illustrators criticized both the creation process and the product itself, claiming that if artificial intelligence programs such as Midjourney are trained on existing illustrations, then the original artists should be financially compensated for derivative works such as Alice and Sparkle. The book was temporarily removed from Amazon in January 2023 because of "suspicious review activity", caused by a high volume of both five-star and one-star reviews.

== See also ==
- Artificial intelligence art
- Shy Girl
- Zarya of the Dawn
