= Daggermouth (novel) =

2026 novel

- Author: H.M. Wolfe
- Language: English
- Publication date: 2026
- Publication place: United States

Daggermouth is a 2026 romantasy novel by H.M. Wolfe.

The book was the center of controversy after a research pre-print identified the book as potentially AI-generated using the Pangram tool. Wolfe denied the use of generative AI and was backed up by the book's publisher.

The book was originally self-published, although later picked up by Scarlett Press (Simon & Schuster). A subsequent four-book deal was signed with publisher Tor Bramble.

The book was originally popularized by BookTok.

== See also ==
- Generative literature
- Natural language generation
