= Text-to-image model =

Machine learning model

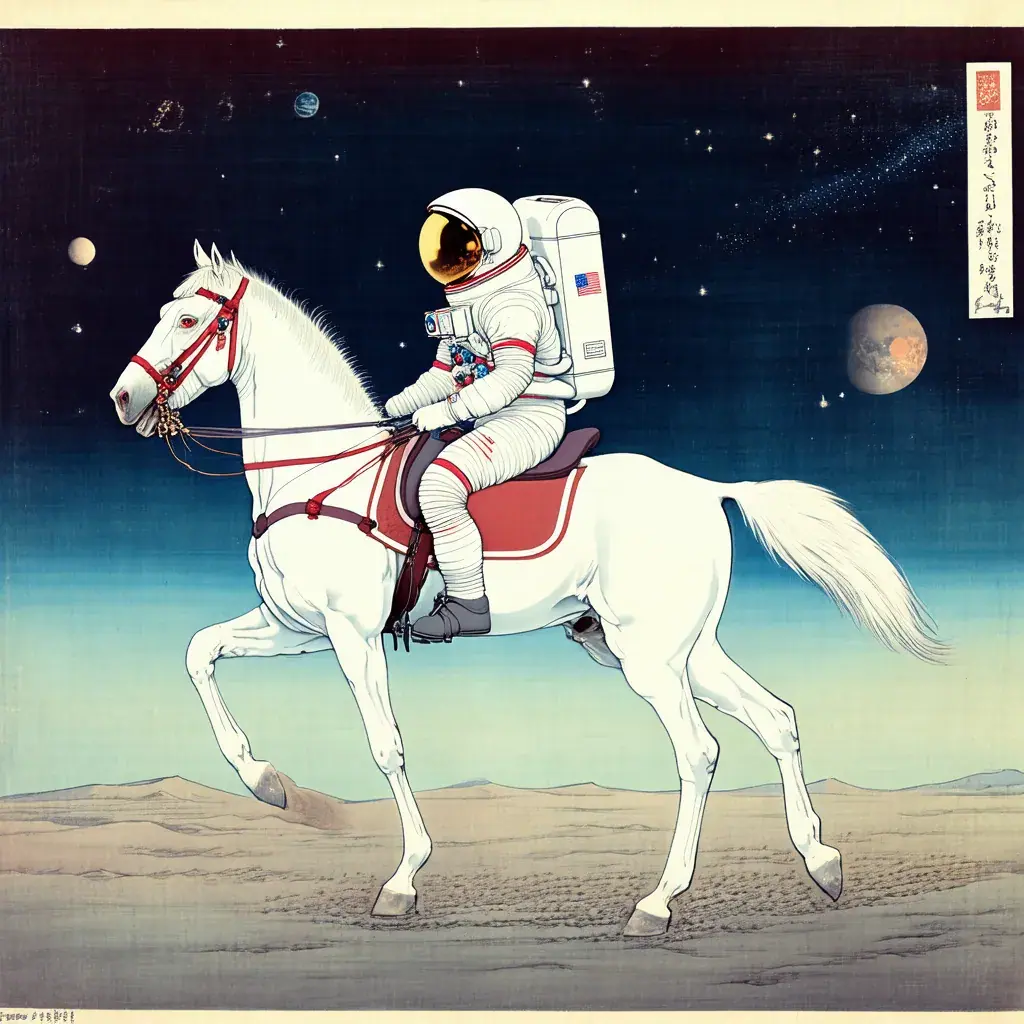
An image conditioned on the prompt an astronaut riding a horse, by Hiroshige, generated by Stable Diffusion 3.5, a large-scale text-to-image model first released in 2022

A text-to-image (T2I or TTI) model is a machine learning model which takes an input natural language prompt and produces an image matching that description.

Text-to-image models gradually began to be developed in the mid-2010s during the beginnings of the AI boom, as a result of advances in deep neural networks. In 2022, the output of state-of-the-art text-to-image models—such as OpenAI's DALL-E 2, Google Brain's Imagen, Stability AI's Stable Diffusion, Midjourney, and Runway's Gen-4—began to be considered to approach the quality of real photographs and human-drawn art.

Text-to-image models are generally latent diffusion models, which perform the diffusion process in a compressed latent space rather than directly in pixel space. An autoencoder (often a variational autoencoder) is used to convert between pixel space and this latent representation. These systems typically use a pretrained language or vision–language model to convert the input prompt into a text embedding, and a diffusion-based generative image model that produces images conditioned on that embedding. The most effective models have generally been trained on massive amounts of image and text data scraped from the web.

== History ==
Before the rise of deep learning in the 2010s, attempts to build text-to-image models were limited to collages by arranging existing component images, such as from a database of clip art.

The inverse task, image captioning, was more tractable, and a number of image captioning deep learning models came prior to the first text-to-image models.

A stop sign is flying in blue skies. by AlignDRAW (2015)

=== 2015–2019 ===
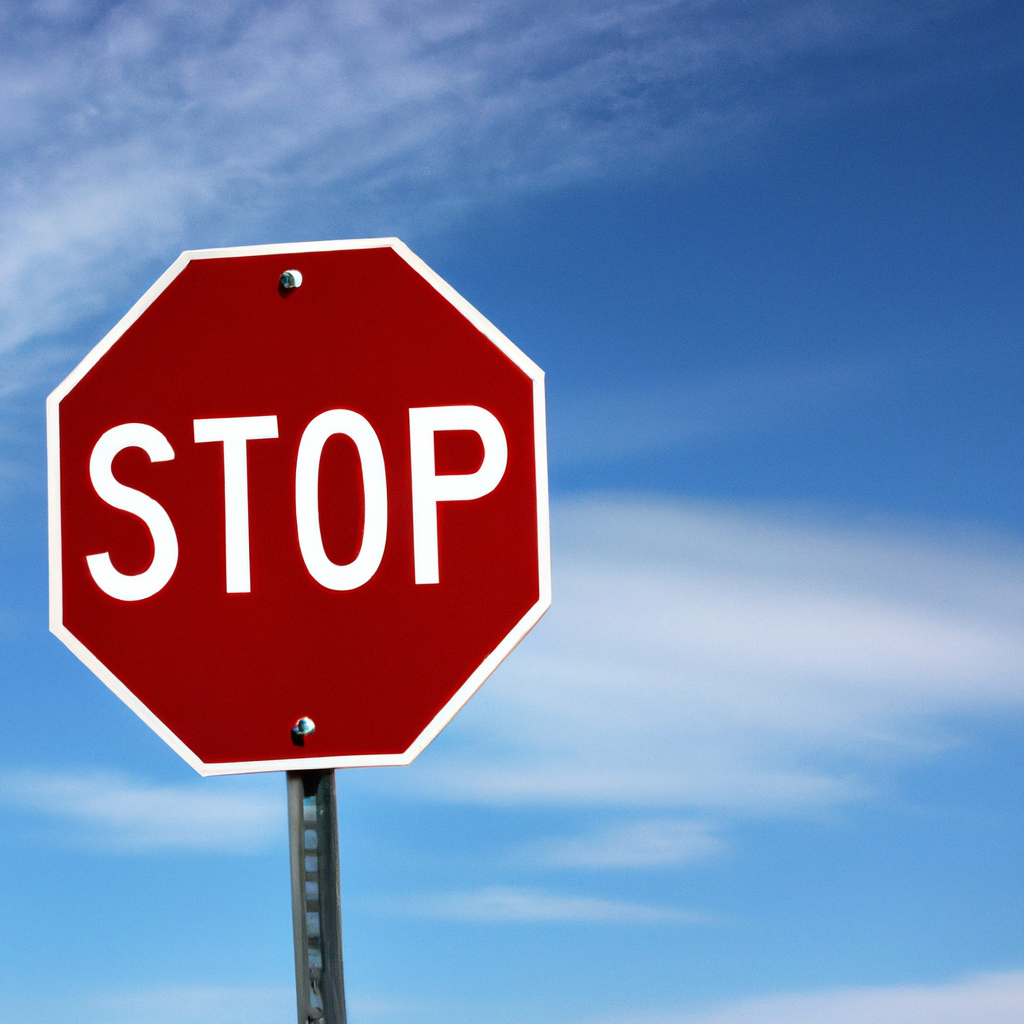
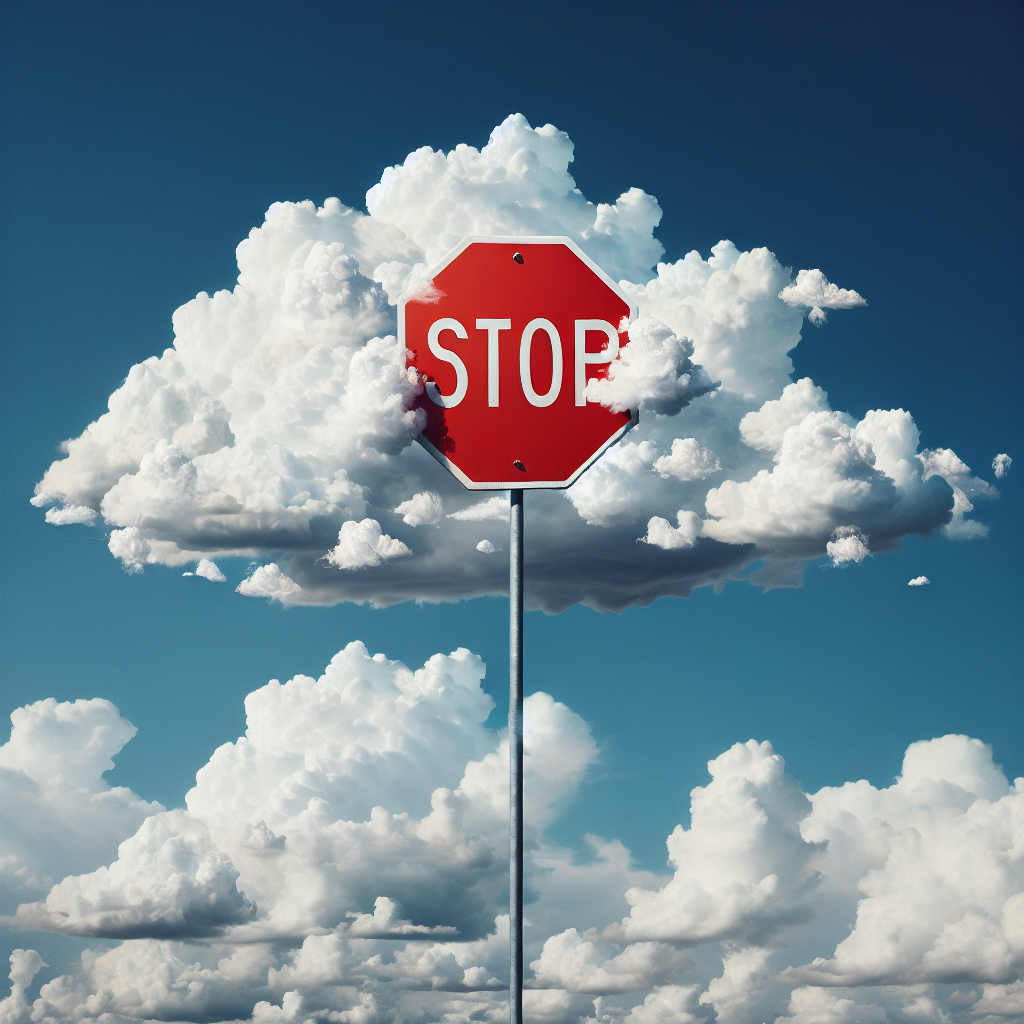
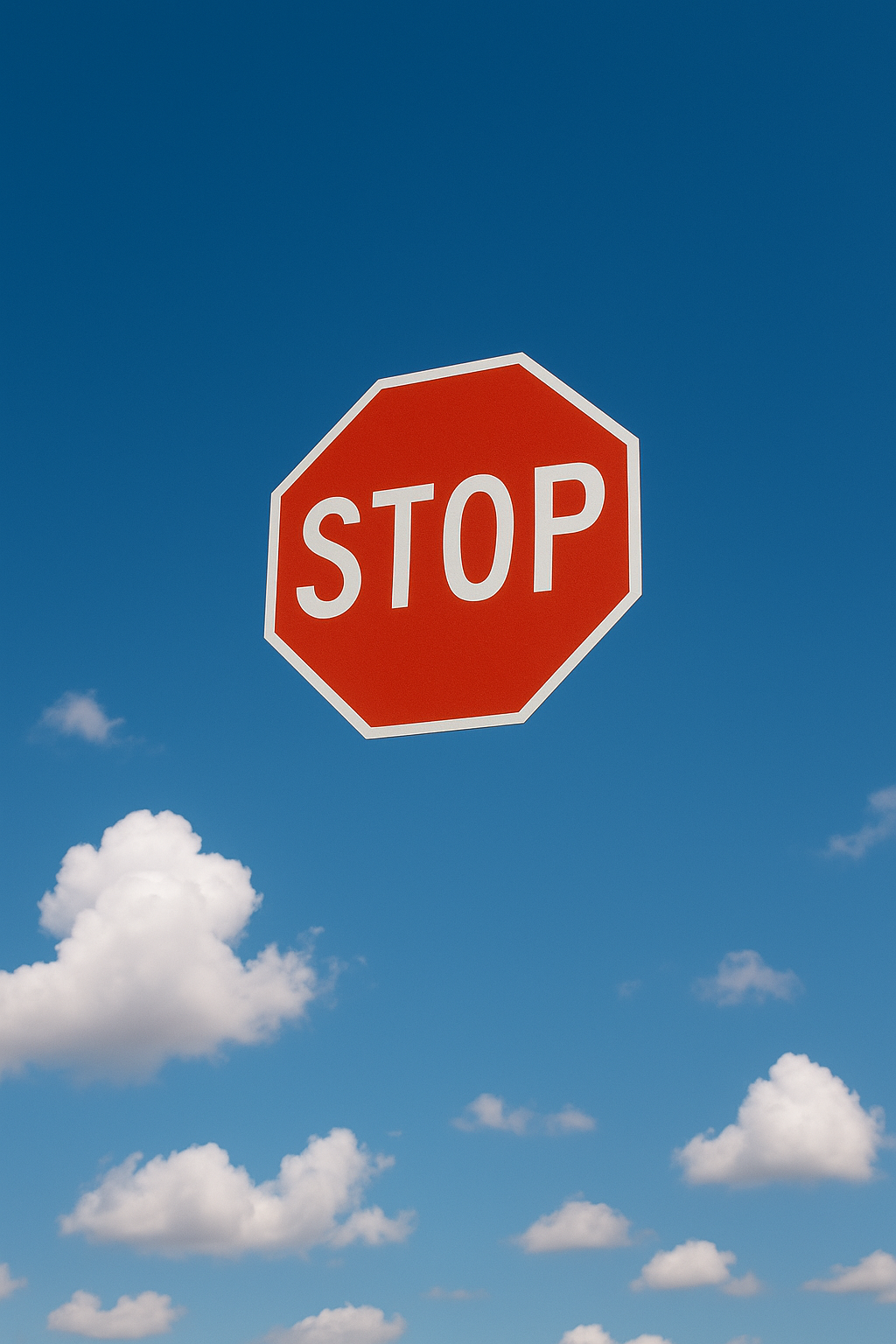
A stop sign is flying in blue skies by OpenAI's DALL-E 2 (2022), DALL-E 3 (2023), and GPT Image 1 (2025)

The first modern text-to-image model, alignDRAW, was introduced in 2015 by researchers from the University of Toronto. alignDRAW extended the previously introduced DRAW architecture (which used a recurrent variational autoencoder with an attention mechanism) to be conditioned on text sequences. Images generated by alignDRAW were in small resolution (32×32 pixels, attained from resizing) and were considered to be 'low in diversity'. The model was able to generalize to objects not represented in the training data (such as a red school bus) and appropriately handled novel prompts such as "a stop sign is flying in blue skies", exhibiting output that it was not merely "memorizing" data from the training set.

In 2016, Reed, Akata, Yan et al. became the first to use generative adversarial networks for the text-to-image task. With models trained on narrow, domain-specific datasets, they were able to generate "visually plausible" images of birds and flowers from text captions like "an all black bird with a distinct thick, rounded bill". A model trained on the more diverse COCO (Common Objects in Context) dataset produced images which were "from a distance... encouraging", but which lacked coherence in their details. Later systems include VQGAN-CLIP, XMC-GAN, and GauGAN2.

=== 2020s ===
One of the first text-to-image models to capture widespread public attention was OpenAI's DALL-E, a transformer system announced in January 2021. A successor capable of generating more complex and realistic images, DALL-E 2, was unveiled in April 2022, followed by Stable Diffusion that was publicly released in August 2022. In August 2022, text-to-image personalization allows to teach the model a new concept using a small set of images of a new object that was not included in the training set of the text-to-image foundation model. This is achieved by textual inversion, namely, finding a new text term that correspond to these images. Additional text-to-image models appeared with Adobe in March 2023 and Black Forest Labs in August 2024.

Following other text-to-image models, language model-powered text-to-video platforms such as Runway, Make-A-Video, Imagen Video, Midjourney, and Phenaki can generate video from text and/or text/image prompts.

== Architecture and training ==
High-level architecture showing the state of AI art machine learning models, and notable models and applications as a clickable SVG image map

Text-to-image models have been built using a variety of architectures. The text encoding step may be performed with a recurrent neural network such as a long short-term memory (LSTM) network, though transformer models have since become a more popular option. For the image generation step, conditional generative adversarial networks (GANs) was once widely used in early days. Since 2020, diffusion models have become the popular option. Rather than directly training a model to output a high-resolution image conditioned on a text embedding, a popular technique is to train a model to generate low-resolution images or latent space, and use one or more auxiliary deep learning models to upscale or decode it, filling in finer details.

Text-to-image models are trained on large datasets of (text, image) pairs, often scraped from the web. With their 2022 Imagen model, Google Brain reported positive results from using a large language model trained separately on a text-only corpus (with its weights subsequently frozen), a departure from the theretofore standard approach.

== Datasets ==
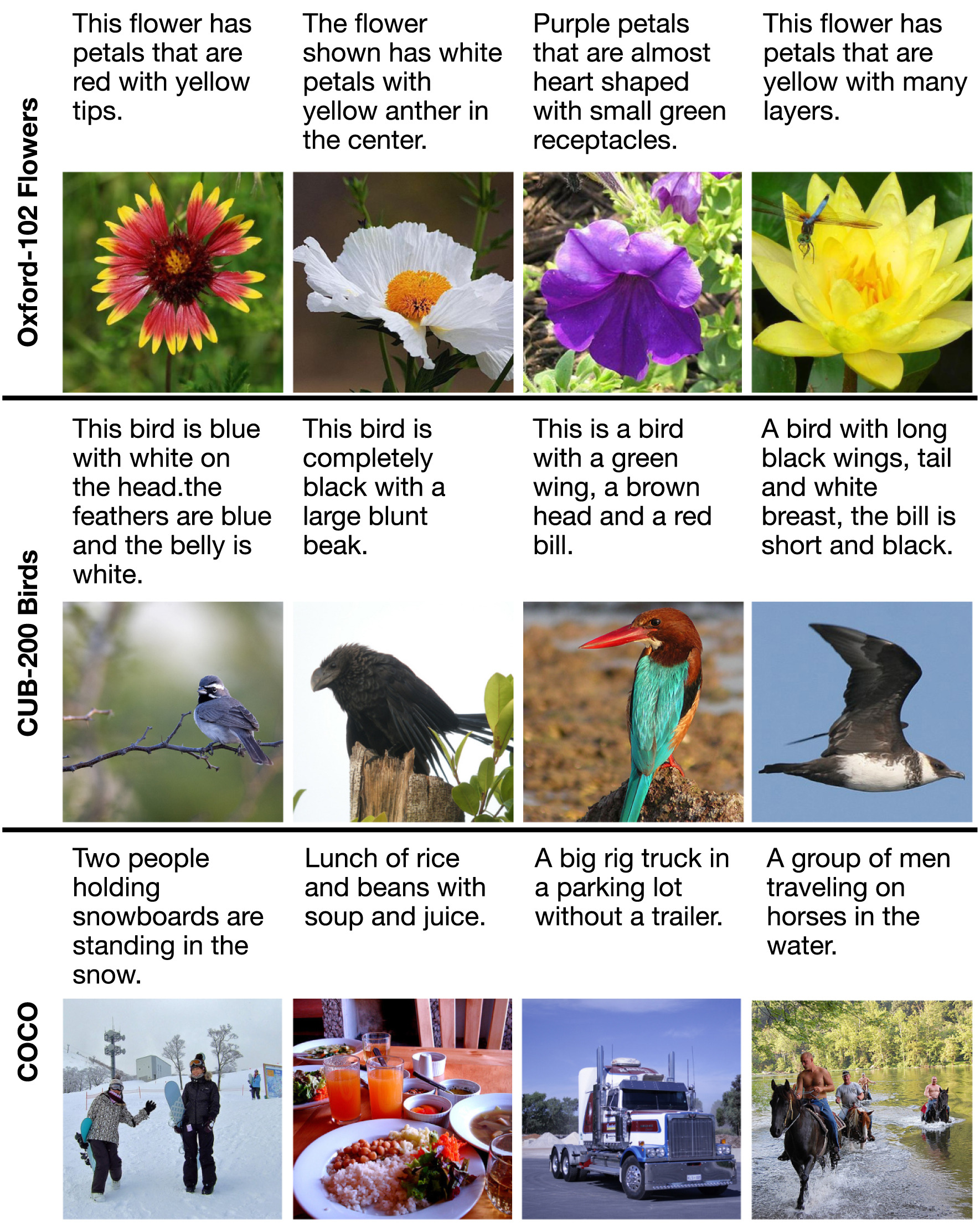
Examples of images and captions from three public datasets which are commonly used to train text-to-image models

Training a text-to-image model requires a dataset of images paired with text captions. One dataset commonly used for this purpose is the COCO dataset. Released by Microsoft in 2014, COCO consists of around 123,000 images depicting a diversity of objects with five captions per image, generated by human annotators. Originally, the main focus of COCO was on the recognition of objects and scenes in images. Oxford-120 Flowers and CUB-200 Birds are smaller datasets of around 10,000 images each, restricted to flowers and birds, respectively. It is considered less difficult to train a high-quality text-to-image model with these datasets because of their narrow range of subject matter.

One of the largest open datasets for training text-to-image models is LAION-5B, containing more than 5 billion image-text pairs. This dataset was created using web scraping and automatic filtering based on similarity to high-quality artwork and professional photographs. Because of this, however, it also contains controversial content, which has led to discussions about the ethics of its use.

Some modern AI platforms not only generate images from text but also create synthetic datasets to improve model training and fine-tuning. These datasets help avoid copyright issues and expand the diversity of training data.

== Quality evaluation ==
Evaluating and comparing the quality of text-to-image models is a problem involving assessing multiple desirable properties. A desideratum specific to text-to-image models is that generated images semantically align with the text captions used to generate them. A number of schemes have been devised for assessing these qualities, some automated and others based on human judgement.

A common algorithmic metric for assessing image quality and diversity is the Inception Score (IS), which is based on the distribution of labels predicted by a pretrained Inceptionv3 image classification model when applied to a sample of images generated by the text-to-image model. The score is increased when the image classification model predicts a single label with high probability, a scheme intended to favour "distinct" generated images. Another popular metric is the related Fréchet inception distance, which compares the distribution of generated images and real training images according to features extracted by one of the final layers of a pretrained image classification model.

== Impact and applications ==
AI has the potential for a societal transformation, which may include enabling the expansion of non-commercial niche genres (such as cyberpunk derivatives like solarpunk) by amateurs, novel entertainment, fast prototyping, increasing art-making accessibility, and artistic output per effort or expenses or time—e.g., via generating drafts, draft-definitions, and image components (inpainting). Generated images are sometimes used as sketches, low-cost experiments, inspiration, or illustrations of proof-of-concept-stage ideas. Additional functionalities or improvements may also relate to post-generation manual editing (i.e., polishing), such as subsequent tweaking with an image editor.

Professional visual artists and designers used generative AI in early-stage conceptualization (divergent thinking) more than final production (convergent thinking) and practices producing digital or ephemeral outputs (e.g., UI/UX design, concept art) more readily integrate these than those producing physical, permanent artifacts (e.g., sculpture, architecture). In physical domains, concerns regarding structural integrity, material constraints, and cultural "ethno-computation" often limit AI to a "complementary enhancement" role rather than a substitute for production. Furthermore, attitudes toward adoption vary significantly by career stage, with entry-level professionals viewing generative AI as a pragmatic extension of digital tools necessary for market competitiveness, whereas senior practitioners often express critical skepticism regarding the devaluation of embodied expertise and long-term skill development.

== List of notable text-to-image models ==
| Name | Release date | Developer | License |
|---|---|---|---|
| DALL-E | January 2021 | OpenAI | Proprietary |
| DALL-E 2 | April 2022 | OpenAI | Proprietary |
| DALL-E 3 | September 2023 | OpenAI | Proprietary |
| GPT Image 1 | March 2025 (Note: Initially referred as the GPT-4o image generation) | OpenAI | Proprietary |
| GPT Image 1.5 | December 2025 | OpenAI | Proprietary |
| GPT Image 2 | April 2026 | OpenAI | Proprietary |
| Ideogram 0.1 | August 2023 | Ideogram | Proprietary |
| Ideogram 2.0 | August 2024 | Ideogram | Proprietary |
| Ideogram 3.0 | March 2025 | Ideogram | Proprietary |
| Ideogram 4.0 | June 2026 | Ideogram | Apache 2.0 License |
| Imagen | April 2023 | Google | Proprietary |
| Imagen 2 | December 2023 | Google | Proprietary |
| Imagen 3 | May 2024 | Google | Proprietary |
| Imagen 4 | May 2025 | Google | Proprietary |
| Firefly | March 2023 | Adobe Inc. | Proprietary |
| Midjourney | July 2022 | Midjourney, Inc. | Proprietary |
| Halfmoon | March 2025 | Reve AI, Inc. | Proprietary |
| Stable Diffusion | August 2022 | Stability AI | Stability AI Community License (Note: This license can be used by individuals and organizations up to $1 million in revenue, for organizations with annual revenue more than $1 million, Stability AI Enterprise License is needed. All outputs are retained by users regardless of revenue.) |
| Flux | August 2024 | Black Forest Labs | Various (Note: The Schnell model uses the Apache 2.0 License, the Dev model uses a non-commercial license and the Pro model is proprietary (only available as API).) |
| Aurora | December 2024 | xAI | Proprietary |
| Runway Gen-2 | June 2023 | Runway AI, Inc. | Proprietary |
| Runway Gen-3 Alpha | June 2024 | Runway AI, Inc. | Proprietary |
| Runway Frames | November 2024 | Runway AI, Inc. | Proprietary |
| Runway Gen-4 | March 2025 | Runway AI, Inc. | Proprietary |
| Recraft | May 2023 | Recraft, Inc. | Proprietary |
| AuraFlow | July 2024 | FAL | Apache 2.0 License |
| HiDream | April 2025 | HiDream-AI | MIT license |

== See also ==
- Text-to-video model
- AI art
- AI slop
- Deepfake
