= DALL-E =

Image-generating deep learning model

- Watermark present on DALL-E images

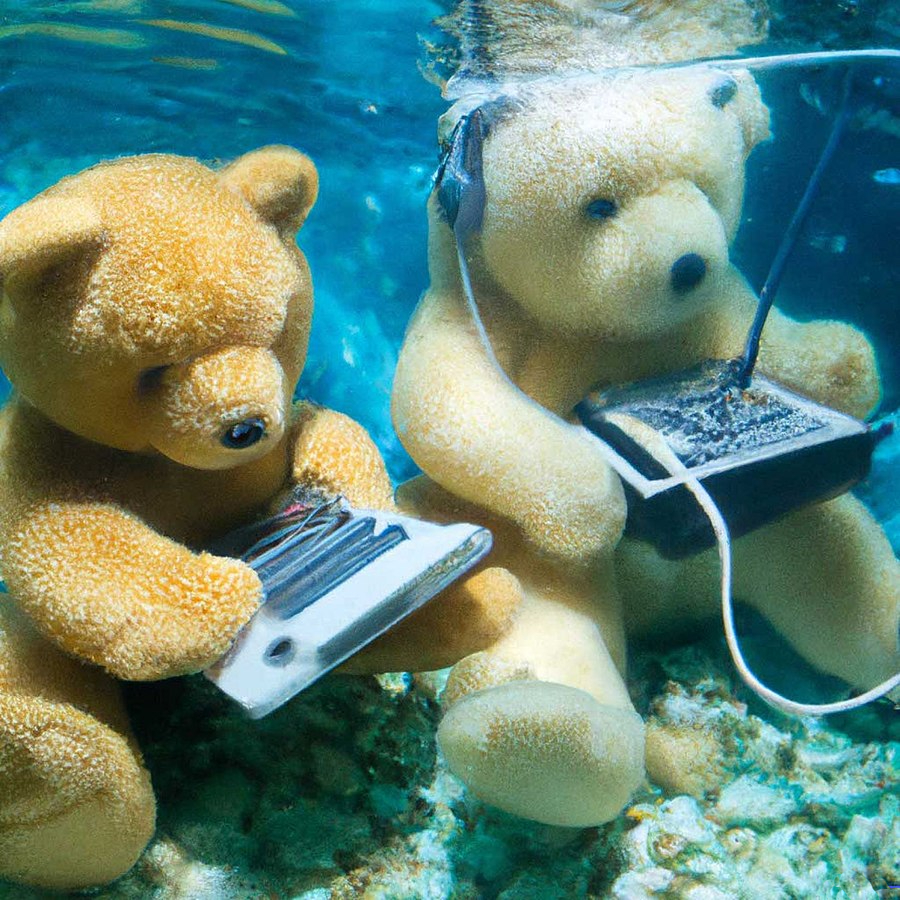
- An image generated by DALL-E 2, from the prompt "Teddy bears working on new AI research underwater with 1990s technology"
- Developer: OpenAI
- Release: 5 January 2021; 5 years ago
- Stable release: 3 / 10 August 2023; 3 years ago
- Platform: Cloud computing platforms
- Successor: GPT Image
- Type: Text-to-image model
- License: Proprietary service

DALL-E, DALL-E 2, and DALL-E 3 (stylised DALL·E) are text-to-image models developed by OpenAI using deep learning methodologies to generate digital images from natural language descriptions known as prompts.

The first version of DALL-E was announced in January 2021. In the following year, its successor DALL-E 2 was released. DALL-E 3 was released natively into ChatGPT for ChatGPT Plus and ChatGPT Enterprise customers in October 2023, with availability via OpenAI's API and "Labs" platform provided in early November. Microsoft implemented the model in Bing's Image Creator tool and plans to implement it into their Designer app. With Bing's Image Creator tool, Microsoft Copilot runs on DALL-E 3. In March 2025, DALL-E 3 was replaced in ChatGPT by GPT Image's native image-generation capabilities.

== History and background ==
DALL-E was revealed by OpenAI in a blog post on 5 January 2021, and uses a version of GPT-3 modified to generate images.

On 6 April 2022, OpenAI announced DALL-E 2, a successor designed to generate more realistic images at higher resolutions that "can combine concepts, attributes, and styles". On 20 July 2022, DALL-E 2 entered into a beta phase with invitations sent to 1 million waitlisted individuals; users could generate a certain number of images for free every month and may purchase more. Access had previously been restricted to pre-selected users for a research preview due to concerns about ethics and safety. On 28 September 2022, DALL-E 2 was opened to everyone and the waitlist requirement was removed. In September 2023, OpenAI announced their latest image model, DALL-E 3, capable of understanding "significantly more nuance and detail" than previous iterations. In early November 2022, OpenAI released DALL-E 2 as an API, allowing developers to integrate the model into their own applications. Microsoft unveiled their implementation of DALL-E 2 in their Designer app and Image Creator tool included in Bing and Microsoft Edge. The API operates on a cost-per-image basis, with prices varying depending on image resolution. Volume discounts are available to companies working with OpenAI's enterprise team.

The software's name is a portmanteau of the names of animated robot Pixar character WALL-E and the Spanish surrealist artist Salvador Dalí.

In February 2024, OpenAI began adding watermarks to DALL-E generated images, containing metadata in the C2PA (Coalition for Content Provenance and Authenticity) standard promoted by the Content Authenticity Initiative.

== Technology ==
The first generative pre-trained transformer (GPT) model was initially developed by OpenAI in 2018, using a Transformer architecture. The first iteration, GPT-1, was scaled up to produce GPT-2 in 2019; in 2020, it was scaled up again to produce GPT-3, with 175 billion parameters.

=== DALL-E ===
DALL-E has three components: a discrete VAE, an autoregressive decoder-only Transformer model (12 billion parameters) similar to GPT-3, and a CLIP pair of image encoder and text encoder.

The discrete VAE can convert an image to a sequence of tokens, and conversely, convert a sequence of tokens back to an image. This is necessary as the Transformer model does not directly process image data.

The input to the Transformer model is a sequence of tokenised image caption followed by tokenised image patches. The image caption is in English, tokenised by byte pair encoding (vocabulary size 16384), and can be up to 256 tokens long. Each image is a 256×256 RGB image, divided into 32×32 patches of 4×4 each. Each patch is then converted by a discrete variational autoencoder to a token (vocabulary size 8192).

DALL-E was developed and announced to the public in conjunction with CLIP (Contrastive Language-Image Pre-training). CLIP is a separate model based on contrastive learning that was trained on 400 million pairs of images with text captions scraped from the Internet. Its role is to "understand and rank" DALL-E's output by predicting which caption from a list of 32,768 captions randomly selected from the dataset (of which one was the correct answer) is most appropriate for an image.

A trained CLIP pair is used to filter a larger initial list of images generated by DALL-E to select the image that is closest to the text prompt.

=== DALL-E 2 ===
DALL-E 2 uses 3.5 billion parameters, a smaller number than its predecessor. Instead of an autoregressive Transformer, DALL-E 2 uses a diffusion model conditioned on CLIP image embeddings, which, during inference, are generated from CLIP text embeddings by a prior model. This is the same architecture as that of Stable Diffusion, released a few months later.

=== DALL-E 3 ===
While a technical report was written for DALL-E 3, it does not include training or implementation details of the model, instead focusing on the improved prompt following capabilities developed for DALL-E 3.

== Capabilities ==
DALL-E can generate imagery in multiple styles, including photorealistic imagery, paintings, and emoji. It can "manipulate and rearrange" objects in its images, and can correctly place design elements in novel compositions without explicit instruction. Thom Dunn writing for BoingBoing remarked that "For example, when asked to draw a daikon radish blowing its nose, sipping a latte, or riding a unicycle, DALL-E often draws the handkerchief, hands, and feet in plausible locations." DALL-E showed the ability to "fill in the blanks" to infer appropriate details without specific prompts, such as adding Christmas imagery to prompts commonly associated with the celebration, and appropriately placed shadows to images that did not mention them. Furthermore, DALL-E exhibits a broad understanding of visual and design trends.

DALL-E can produce images for a wide variety of arbitrary descriptions from various viewpoints with only rare failures. Mark Riedl, an associate professor at the Georgia Tech School of Interactive Computing, found that DALL-E could blend concepts (described as a key element of human creativity).

Its visual reasoning ability is sufficient to solve Raven's Matrices (visual tests often administered to humans to measure intelligence).

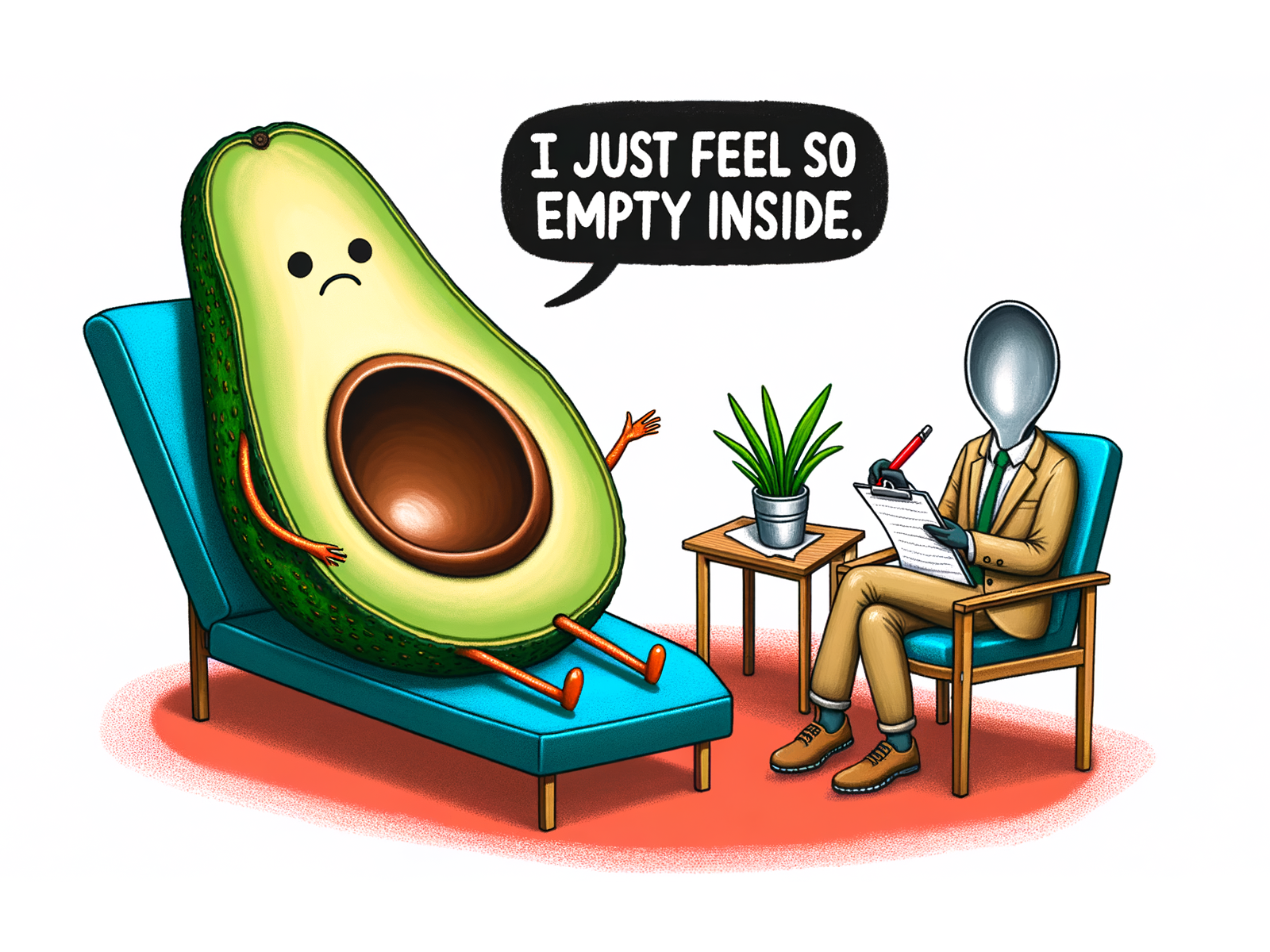
An image generated by DALL-E 3 based on the text prompt "An illustration of an avocado sitting in a therapist's chair, saying 'I just feel so empty inside' with a pit-sized hole in its centre. The therapist, a spoon, scribbles notes"

DALL-E 3 follows complex prompts with more accuracy and detail than its predecessors, and is able to generate more coherent and accurate text. DALL-E 3 is integrated into ChatGPT Plus.

=== Image modification ===
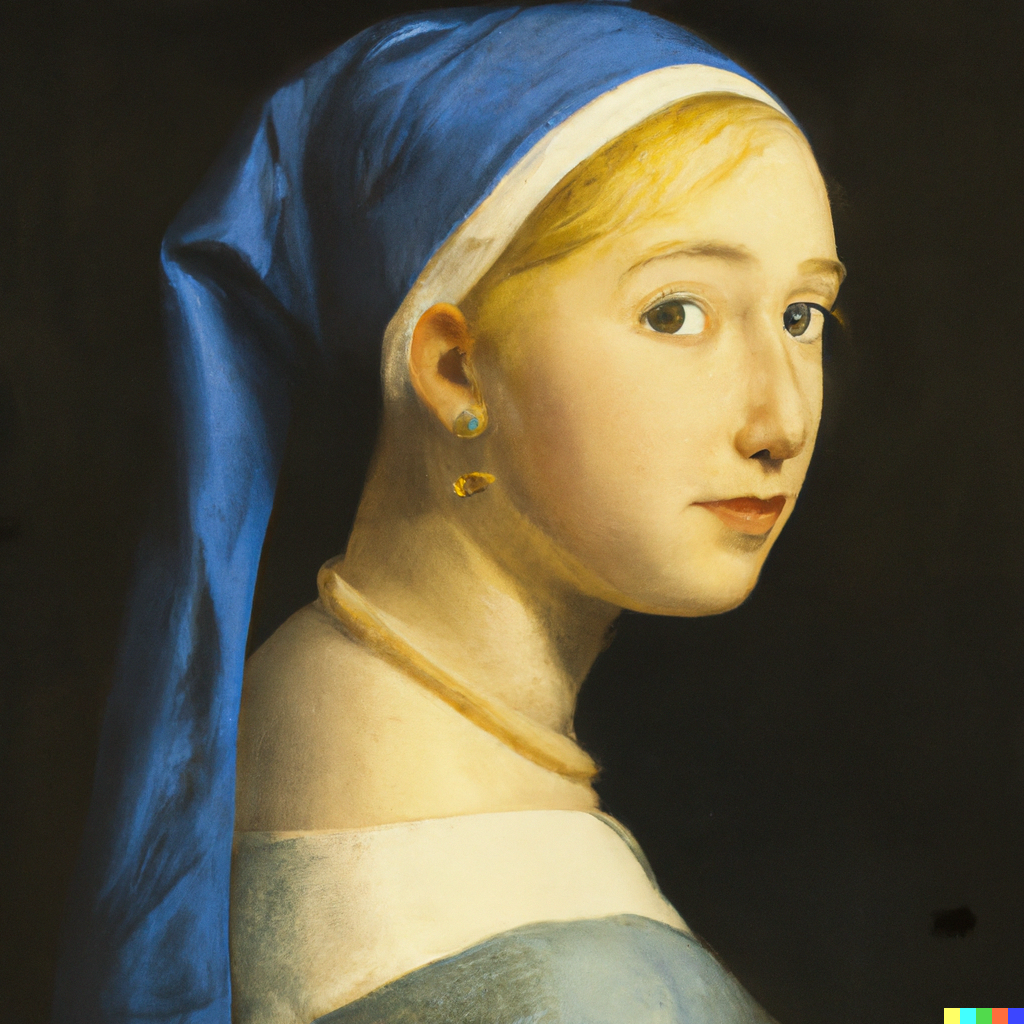
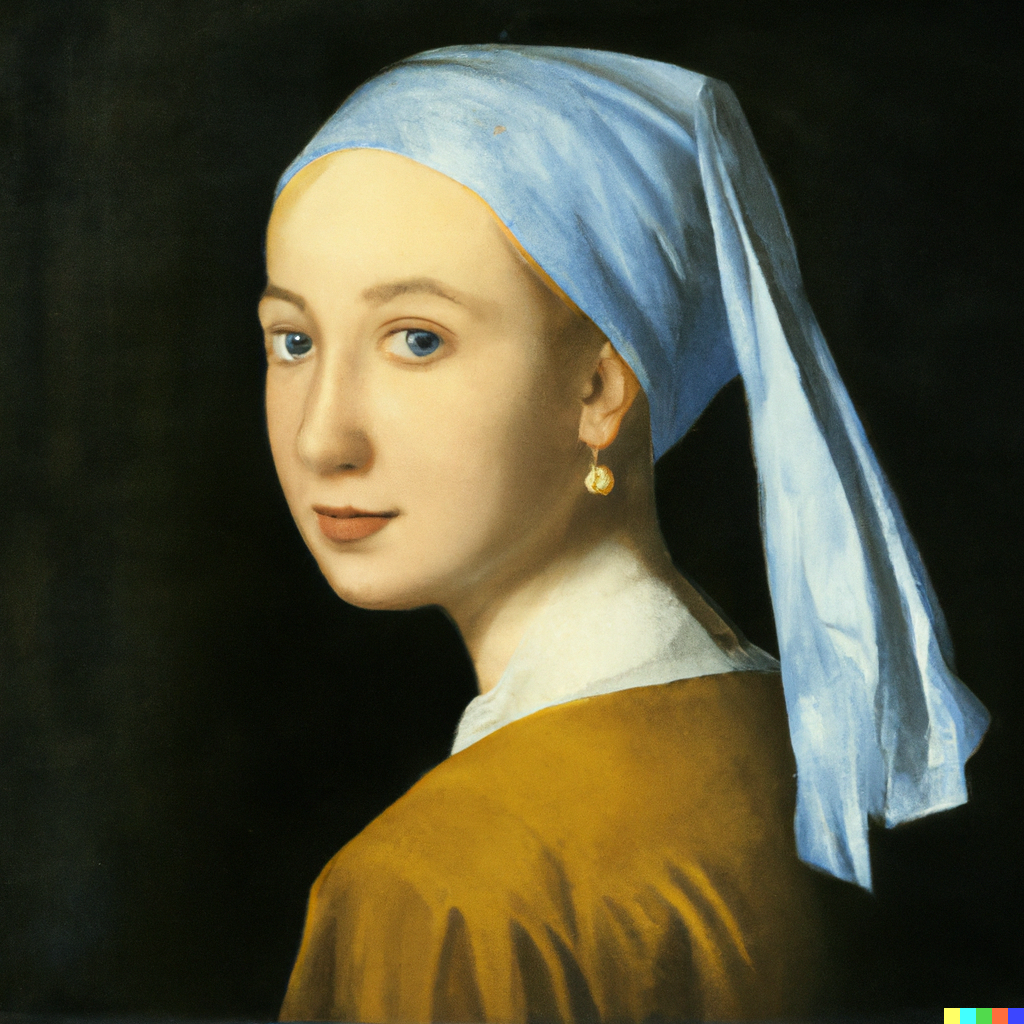
Two "variations" of Girl With a Pearl Earring generated with DALL-E 2

Given an existing image, DALL-E 2 and DALL-E 3 can produce "variations" of the image as individual outputs based on the original, as well as edit the image to modify or expand upon it. The "inpainting" and "outpainting" abilities of these models use context from an image to fill in missing areas using a medium consistent with the original, following a given prompt.

For example, this can be used to insert a new subject into an image, or expand an image beyond its original borders. According to OpenAI, "Outpainting takes into account the image's existing visual elements—including shadows, reflections, and textures—to maintain the context of the original image."

=== Technical limitations ===
DALL-E 2's language understanding has limits. It is sometimes unable to distinguish "A yellow book and a red vase" from "A red book and a yellow vase" or "A panda making latte art" from "Latte art of a panda". It generates images of an astronaut riding a horse when presented with the prompt "a horse riding an astronaut". It also fails to generate the correct images in a variety of circumstances. Requesting more than three objects, negation, numbers, and connected sentences may result in mistakes, and object features may appear on the wrong object. Additional limitations include generating text, ambigrams and other forms of typography, which often results in dream-like gibberish. The model also has a limited capacity to address scientific information, such as astronomy or medical imagery.

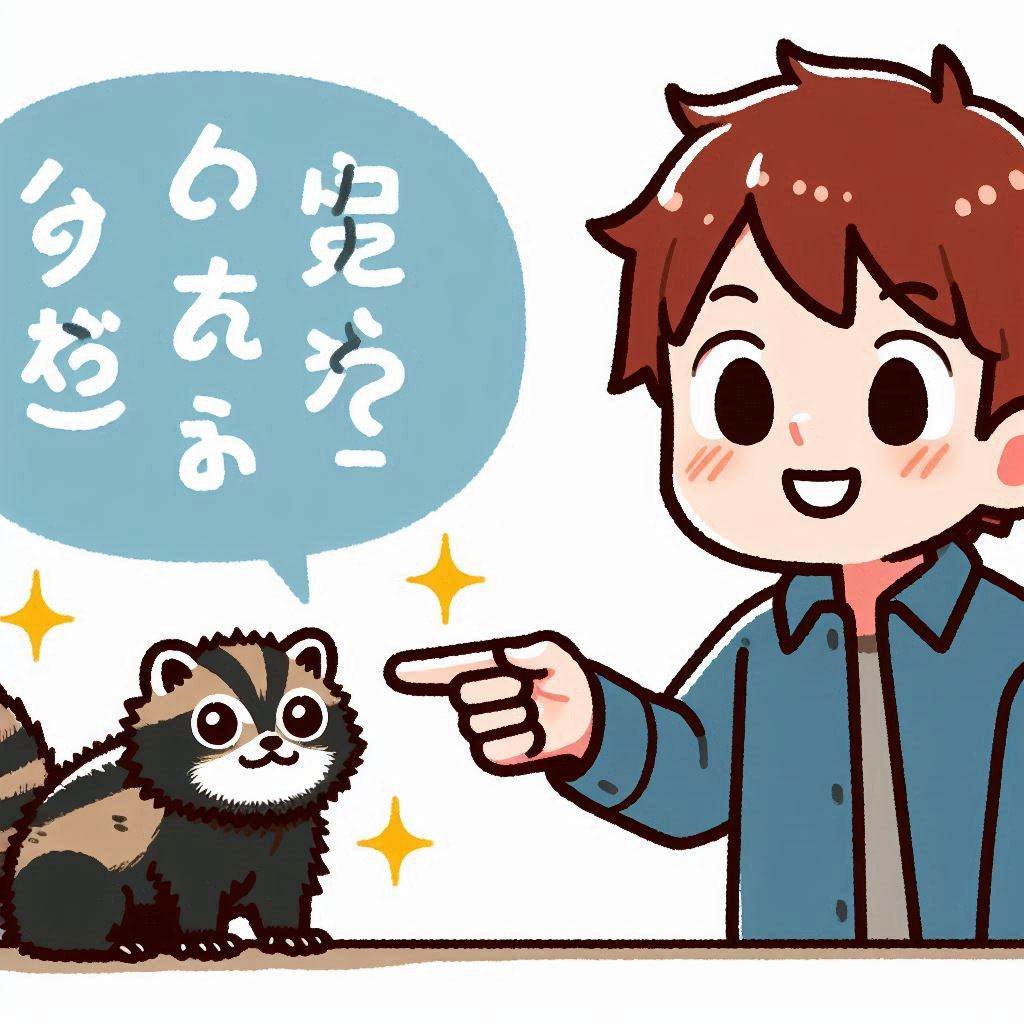
An attempt to generate Japanese text using the prompt "a person pointing at a tanuki, with a speech bubble that says 'これは狸です！'", which results in the text being rendered with nonsensical kanji and kana

== Ethical concerns ==
DALL-E 2's reliance on public datasets influences its results and leads to algorithmic bias in some cases, such as generating higher numbers of men than women for requests that do not mention gender. DALL-E 2's training data was filtered to remove violent and sexual imagery, but this was found to increase bias in some cases such as reducing the frequency of women being generated. OpenAI hypothesise that this may be because women were more likely to be sexualised in training data which caused the filter to influence results. In September 2022, OpenAI confirmed to The Verge that DALL-E invisibly inserts phrases into user prompts to address bias in results; for instance, "Black man" and "Asian woman" are inserted into prompts that do not specify gender or race. OpenAI claims to address concerns for potential "racy content"—containing nudity or sexual content generation, with DALL-E 3 through input/output filters, blocklists, ChatGPT refusals, and model level interventions. However, DALL-E 3 continues to disproportionally represent people as White, female, and youthful. Users are able to somewhat remedy this through more specific prompts for image generation.

A concern about DALL-E 2 and similar image generation models is that they could be used to propagate deepfakes and other forms of misinformation. As an attempt to mitigate this, the software rejects prompts involving public figures and uploads containing human faces. Prompts containing potentially objectionable content are blocked, and uploaded images are analysed to detect offensive material. A disadvantage of prompt-based filtering is that it is easy to bypass using alternative phrases that result in a similar output. For example, the word "blood" is filtered, but "ketchup" and "red liquid" are not.

Another concern about DALL-E 2 and similar models is that they could cause technological unemployment for artists, photographers, and graphic designers due to their accuracy and popularity. DALL-E 3 is designed to block users from generating art in the style of currently-living artists. While OpenAI states that images produced using these models do not require permission to reprint, sell, or merchandise, legal concerns have been raised regarding who owns those images.

In 2023 Microsoft pitched the United States Department of Defense to use DALL-E models to train battlefield management systems. In January 2024 OpenAI removed its blanket ban on military and warfare use from its usage policies.

== Reception ==
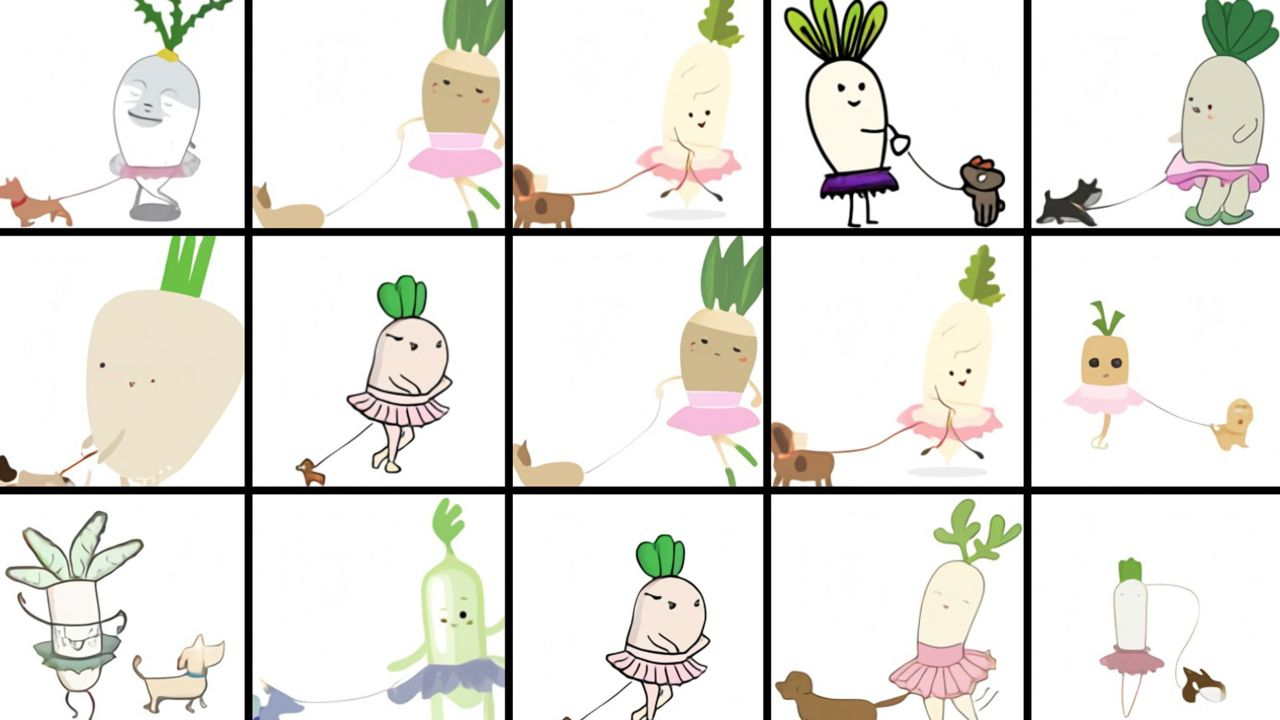
Images generated by DALL-E upon the prompt: "an illustration of a baby daikon radish in a tutu walking a dog"

Most coverage of DALL-E focuses on a small subset of "surreal" or "quirky" outputs. DALL-E's output for "an illustration of a baby daikon radish in a tutu walking a dog" was mentioned in pieces from Input, NBC, Nature, and other publications. Its output for "an armchair in the shape of an avocado" was also widely covered.

ExtremeTech stated "you can ask DALL-E for a picture of a phone or vacuum cleaner from a specified period of time, and it understands how those objects have changed". Engadget also noted its unusual capacity for "understanding how telephones and other objects change over time".

According to MIT Technology Review, one of OpenAI's objectives was to "give language models a better grasp of the everyday concepts that humans use to make sense of things".

Wall Street investors have had a positive reception of DALL-E 2, with some firms thinking it could represent a turning point for a future multi-trillion dollar industry. By mid-2019, OpenAI had already received over $1 billion in funding from Microsoft and Khosla Ventures, and in January 2023, following the launch of DALL-E 2 and ChatGPT, received an additional $10 billion in funding from Microsoft.

Japan's anime community has had a negative reaction to DALL-E 2 and similar models. Two arguments are typically presented by artists against the software. The first is that AI art is not art because it is not created by a human with intent. "The juxtaposition of AI-generated images with their own work is degrading and undermines the time and skill that goes into their art. AI-driven image generation tools have been heavily criticized by artists because they are trained on human-made art scraped from the web." The second is the trouble with copyright law and data text-to-image models are trained on. OpenAI has not released information about what dataset(s) were used to train DALL-E 2, inciting concern from some that the work of artists has been used for training without permission. Copyright laws surrounding these topics are inconclusive at the moment.

After integrating DALL-E 3 into Bing Chat and ChatGPT, Microsoft and OpenAI faced criticism for excessive content filtering, with critics saying DALL-E had been "lobotomized." The flagging of images generated by prompts such as "man breaks server rack with sledgehammer" was cited as evidence. Over the first days of its launch, filtering was reportedly increased to the point where images generated by some of Bing's own suggested prompts were being blocked. TechRadar argued that leaning too heavily on the side of caution could limit DALL-E's value as a creative tool.

== Open-source alternatives ==
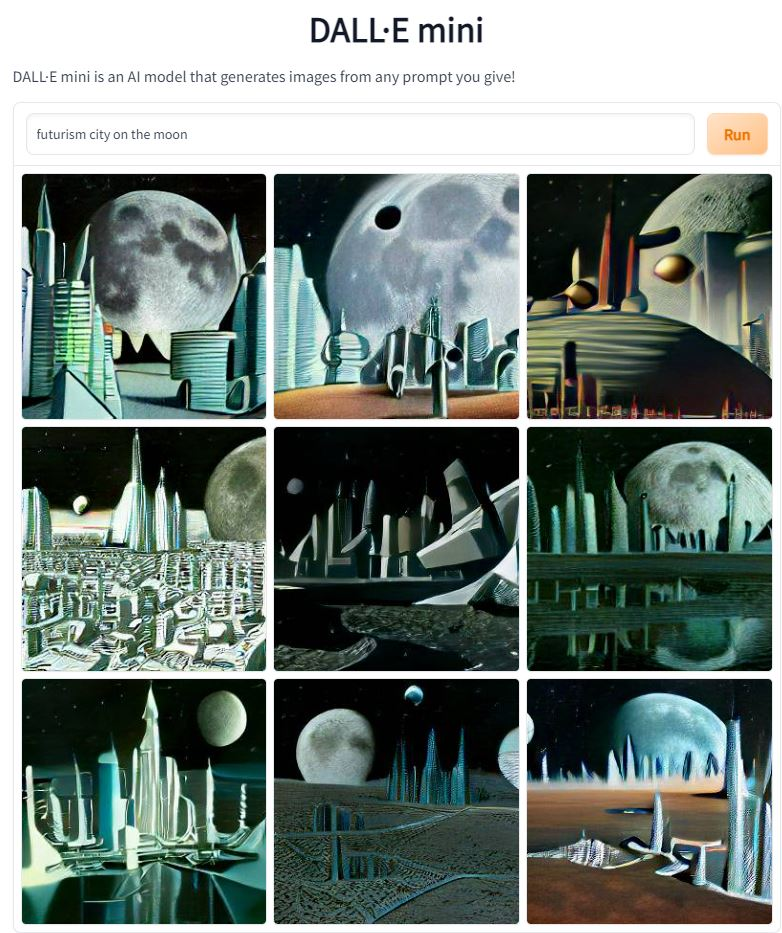
DALL-E Mini image generation in June 2022

Since OpenAI has not released source code or weights for any of the three models, there have been several attempts to create open-source models offering similar capabilities. Released in 2022 on Hugging Face's Spaces platform, Craiyon (formerly DALL-E Mini until a name change was requested by OpenAI in June 2022) is an AI model based on the original DALL-E that was trained on unfiltered data from the Internet. It attracted substantial media attention in mid-2022, after its release due to its capacity for producing humorous imagery. Another example of an open source text-to-image model is Stable Diffusion by Stability AI.

== See also ==
- AI art
- DeepDream
- GPT Image
- Imagen
- Midjourney
- Prompt engineering
- Recraft
- Runway
- Stable Diffusion
