= Théâtre D'opéra Spatial =

2022 AI-generated artwork

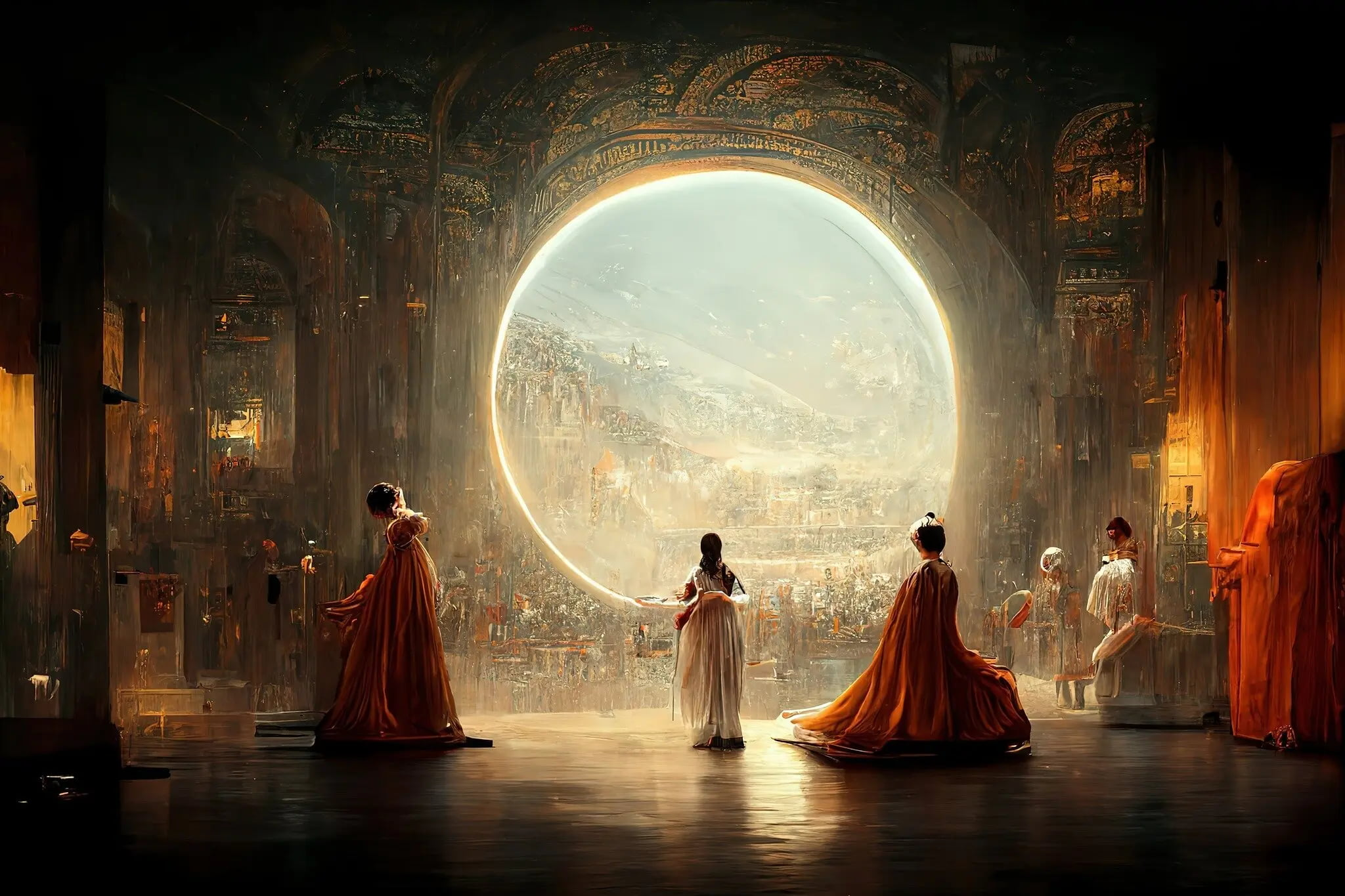
- Artist: Jason M. Allen
- Year: 2022
- Medium: Digital image
- Movement: Generative AI

Théâtre D'opéra Spatial (pronounced [teɑtʁ dɔpeʁa spasjal]; French for 'Space Opera Theater') is a digital arts piece generated and edited by American artist Jason M. Allen with the generative artificial intelligence (GenAI) model Midjourney. It won the 2022 Colorado State Fair's annual fine art competition in the "emerging artist" (non-professional) division of the "Digital Arts/Digitally-Manipulated Photography" category (Note: The category was for "Emerging Artists" and was called "Digital Arts/Digitally-Manipulated Photography", where "Digital Arts" was defined as: "Artistic practice that uses digital technology as part of the creative or presentation process" and "Digitally-Manipulated Photography" was defined as: "Digitally editing a photograph more than 10%.") on August 29, becoming one of the first images made using GenAI to win such a prize. The award came with a $300 cash prize.

Allen said he used at least 624 text prompts and revisions as inputs for Midjourney to create the initial image. He then edited it with Adobe Photoshop and upscaled it using a tool called Gigapixel AI.

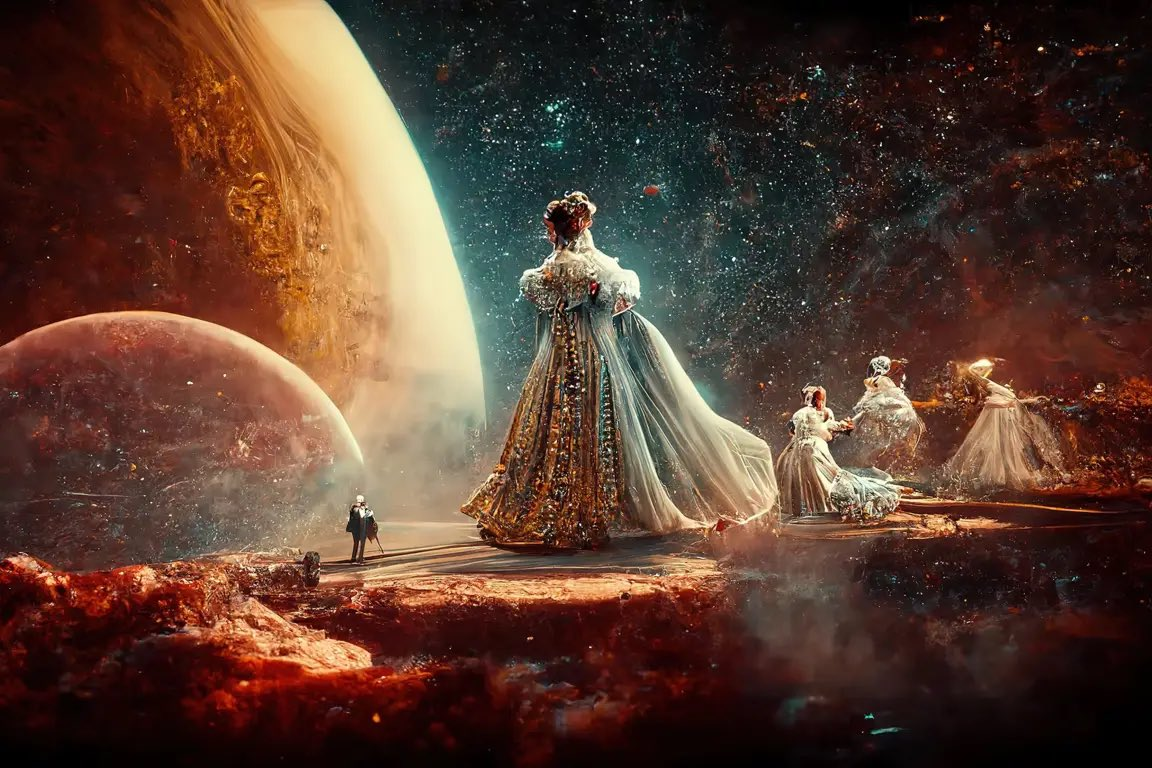
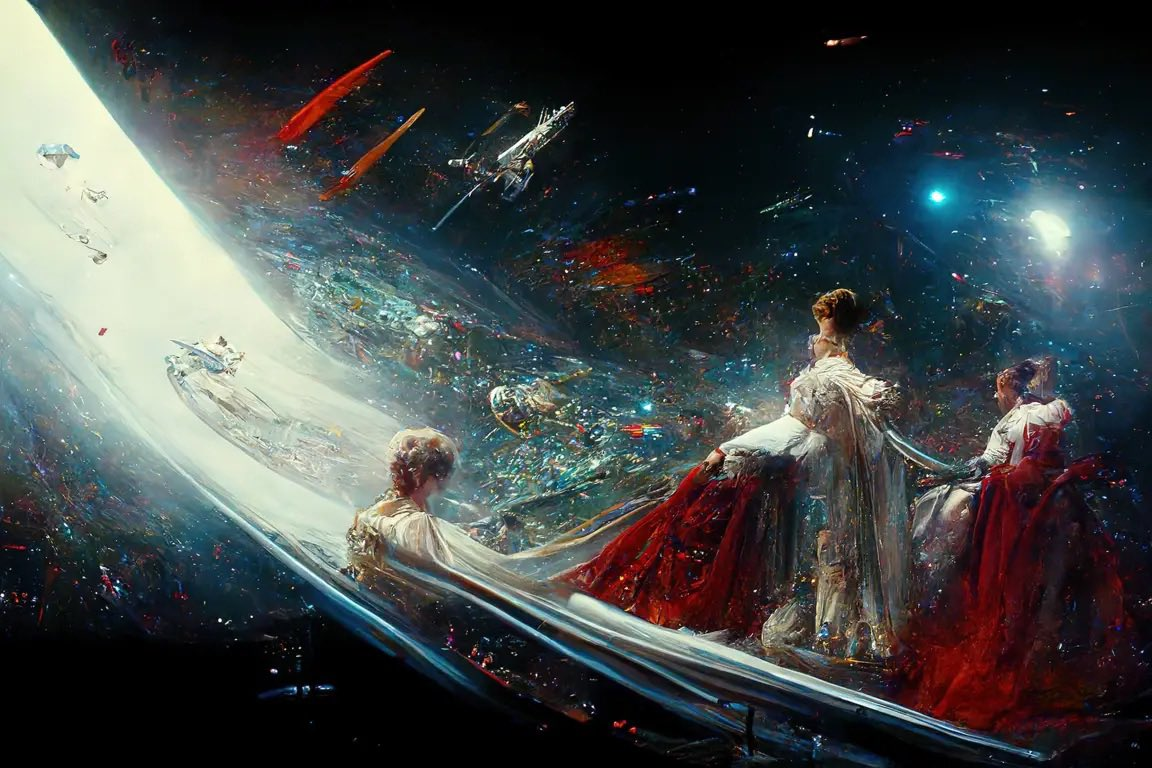
The other two space opera-themed entries submitted by Allen to the competition. One is called Theatre Opéra Spatial and the other Théâtre de l'opéra de l'espace.

Only residents of Colorado could compete at the Colorado State Fair. The "emerging artist" division was open to art students in high school and college, and amateurs whose "income is not significantly impacted by the sale of your artwork." The emerging artist "Digital Arts/Digitally-Manipulated Photography" category included 18 images by 11 participants. Allen submitted three and disclosed that he used Midjourney to create them. The two judges for the category later said they did not know that Midjourney used AI to generate images, but that they would have awarded Allen the top prize regardless. One, a local author and art historian named Dagny McKinley, said it reminded her of Renaissance art. Allen had printed his three submissions on canvas for display at the fair; two were later sold for US$750.

Though there was little contention about it at the fair, some artists on social media were more negative. Olga Robak, a spokeswoman for the Colorado Department of Agriculture, compared it to Comedian, a piece of conceptual art consisting of a fresh banana duct taped to a wall. Allen responded that he did not break any rules. The Colorado State Fair began requiring its participants, starting in 2023, to disclose whether they used AI.

== Copyright ==
On September 21, 2022, Allen submitted an application to the United States Copyright Office (USCO) for registration of the image. Prior to the first formal refusal, the USCO Examiner requested for the request to exclude any features of the image generated by Midjourney. Allen declined, and requested copyright for the full image.

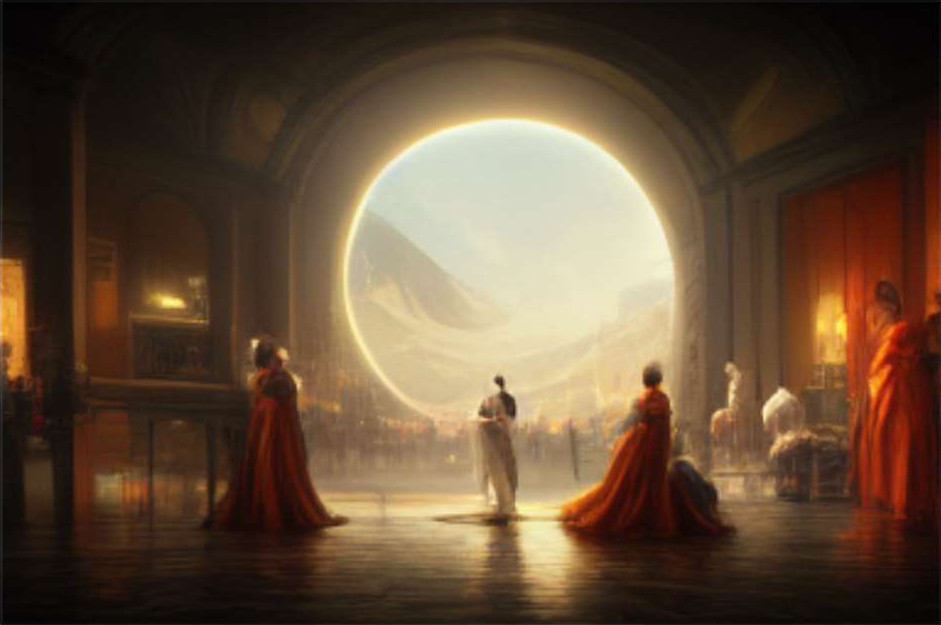
An earlier version of the artwork, created using only Midjourney

In December 2022, the USCO issued a first formal refusal, noting that the image included "inextricably merged, inseparable contribution" from Allen and Midjourney. In January 2023, Allen filed a first request for reconsideration. Later, in March, Allen launched an online campaign and made his previous appeal public. In June 2023, the USCO continued the refusal, writing that the edits made using Photoshop could be registered but that the portion of the image created using Midjourney and Gigapixel AI had to be excluded. Allen filed a second request for reconsideration on July 12, 2023, arguing that case law as well as public policy reasons supported registration of the image.

On September 5, 2023, the USCO Review Board made a final determination and found that Théâtre D'Opéra Spatial was not eligible for copyright protection as the human creative input was de minimis, with the AI-generated elements dominating. The rules "exclude works produced by non-humans". This decision continued the USCO's previous guidance given in respect to AI. Allen said he will continue to try to gain copyright registration. In September, Allen attempted to appeal the copyright office's decision, although Kit Walsh, attorney for the Electronic Frontier Foundation, rejected Allen's claims that the USCO made an incorrect decision.

== See also ==
- Artificial intelligence and copyright
- Artificial intelligence controversies
