= GPT Image =

Image-generation models developed by OpenAI

- An image generated with GPT Image 1
- Developer: OpenAI
- Release: March 25, 2025; 19 months ago
- Stable release: GPT Image 2.6 / November 4, 2026; 17 days ago
- Predecessor: DALL-E
- Type: Image generation and editing
- Website: ChatGPT Images 2.5

GPT Image is a series of image generation and editing models developed by OpenAI. A text-to-image variant of the GPT family, it uses deep learning methodologies to generate digital images from natural language descriptions or images precisely. As the successor to DALL-E, GPT Image is native to ChatGPT as ChatGPT Images and available through the API. Upon release in March 2025, GPT Image went viral on social media, particularly for its capability of generating images in the style of Studio Ghibli. GPT Image is also available with Microsoft Copilot and Apple Intelligence as well.

== History ==
Complex image content generated with GPT Image 2.5 and the short prompt "1960's art of cow getting abducted by UFO in midwest" (September 2026)

Sheet generated by the short prompt "Create a fact sheet on the twelve labours of Hercules" (September 2026). Errors include some malformed meander border and the "three-headed Cerberus" being shown with four heads.

The first model of GPT Image was revealed by OpenAI as the "GPT-4o image generation" in a blog post on March 25, 2025, developed based on the GPT-4o model to generate images. It was initially made available to only paid users, with the rollout to free users delayed due to high demands. The use of the feature was subsequently limited, with Sam Altman saying that the GPUs were "melting" from the level of use. OpenAI later said that over 130 million users around the world had created more than 700 million images in the first week. The model was named as GPT Image 1 (gpt-image-1) and introduced to the API on April 23. A cost-efficient version was released as GPT Image 1 Mini (gpt-image-1-mini) on October 6, also OpenAI DevDay 2025, with the cost in the API 80% less expensive than GPT Image 1.

A new model named GPT Image 1.5 (gpt-image-1.5) was introduced on December 16, which was rolled out globally as the "ChatGPT Images" to all users and immediately made available via the API. OpenAI claimed that the new model can make precise edits while keeping details intact, and generates images up to four times faster. Image inputs and outputs in the API are 20% cheaper in GPT Image 1.5 as compared to GPT Image 1.

In April 2026, OpenAI released GPT Image 2 (gpt-image-2) which introduced a reasoning model into their generation.

GPT Image 2.5 was released on September 8, 2026. The model introduced a Sketch feature that allows users to turn their drawings into an AI image, and the latency of the image generation decreased by 50%. Two versions were released on the API, one called Flare (gpt-image-2.5/flare), designed to be quicker while maintaining some quality and Sunburst (gpt-image-2.5/sunburst) is designed to be more detailed at the expense of taking more time.

GPT Image 2.6 was released on November 4, 2026. The model introduced an ability to create animated GIFs from a prompt or an uploaded photo, allowing users to adjust the GIF’s animation speed, edit individual frames, and share it with others.

== Capabilities ==
Unlike the diffusion predecessors of DALL-E 2 and DALL-E 3 models, GPT Image models are autoregressive with several new capabilities including image-to-image transformation, advanced photorealism and detailed instruction following. GPT Image can generate images in three sizes, namely 1024 × 1024 (1:1, square), 1536 × 1024 (3:2, landscape), and 1024 × 1536 (2:3, portrait) pixels.

GPT Image 1.5 addresses premature cropping and the warm color bias from the previous model, but it has regressed for generating in some specific art styles. Moreover, the weakness of multiple faces and some languages such as Chinese, Arabic, Hebrew, etc. still remained.

== Reception ==
Technology commentators generally regarded GPT Image as significant advances in image generation. TechRadar highlighted that GPT Image 1 delivers impressive performance capable of producing a wide range of outputs from photorealistic scenes to stylized illustrations, noting notable improvements in text rendering and multimodal integration compared with earlier tools. However, Heise Online reported that GPT Image 1 exhibits technical weaknesses such as over-sharpening artifacts, a warm color bias, and common mistakes in rendering human poses and object overlaps, indicating limitations in output realism despite overall strong performance.

== Cultural impact ==
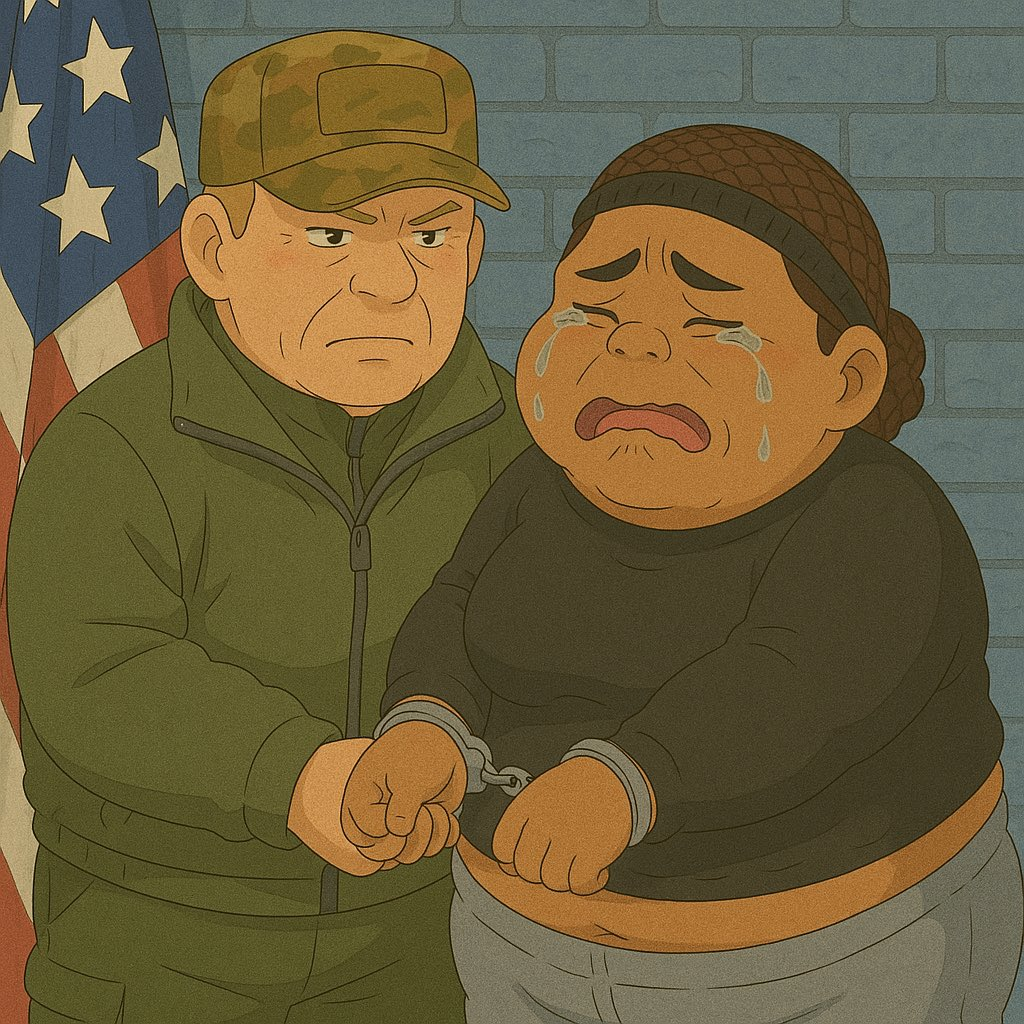
An image generated by GPT Image 1 from the White House's official Twitter account, showing the arrest of a migrant by the Trump administration

Upon the launch of GPT Image 1 in March 2025, photographs recreated in the style of Studio Ghibli films went viral. Sam Altman acknowledged the trend by changing his Twitter profile picture into a Studio Ghibli-inspired one. In response to the trend, many commentators referred to Ghibli director Hayao Miyazaki's previous negative comments on AI art. Some creative professionals, including animator Alex Hirsch, criticized Altman for profiting from Studio Ghibli's work. North American distributor GKids indirectly commented on the trend, alluding to "a time when technology tries to replicate humanity" in a press release for the re-release of the 1997 Studio Ghibli film Princess Mononoke. The White House's official Twitter account posted a Ghibli-style image mocking the arrest by immigration authorities of Virginia Basora-Gonzalez, a migrant from the Dominican Republic, which shows her crying as an immigration officer places her in handcuffs.

== See also ==
- Artificial intelligence visual art
- DALL-E
- Nano Banana
- Stable Diffusion
