= AI art =

Visual content generation through artificial intelligence

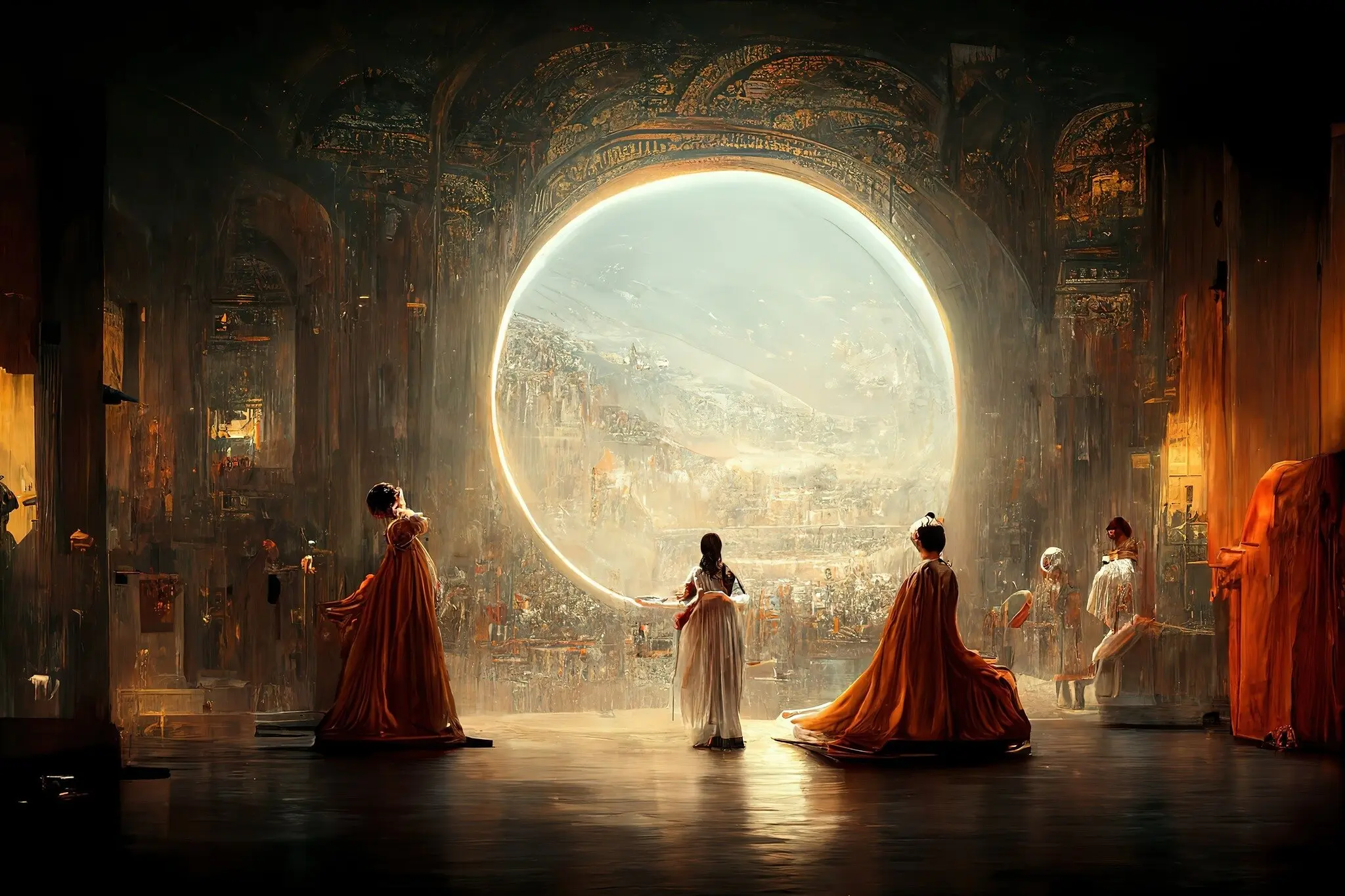
Théâtre D'opéra Spatial (Space Opera Theater; Midjourney, 2022) won the 2022 Colorado State Fair's annual fine art competition in the "emerging artist" (non-professional) division of the "Digital Arts/Digitally-Manipulated Photography" category.

Artificial intelligence visual art, or AI art, is media generated by or with the assistance of artificial intelligence (AI), particularly generative AI. The classification of such output as "art" is controversial, and AI-created works have been variously rejected or recognized by pre-existing artistic institutions. AI is trained to attract people to art and patterns they like.

The application of robotics or primitive algorithms to art has been discussed or practiced since antiquity; however, the term primarily refers to visual works created by modern generative AI trained on preexisting content. During the AI boom of the 2020s, text-to-image models such as Midjourney, DALL-E and Stable Diffusion became widely available to the public, allowing users to quickly generate imagery with little effort. The history of artificial intelligence has raised many questions on the nature of art in human–AI collaboration, while commentary about AI art in the 2020s has often focused on issues related to copyright, deception, defamation, and its impact on more traditional artists, including technological unemployment. AI art frequently constitutes AI slop, mass-produced content for online engagement at the expense of quality.

In August 2023, a United States district court ruled that AI art is ineligible for copyright due to failure to meet human authorship. In March 2026, it declined to hear a case over whether AI-generated art can be subject to copyright.

== History ==
=== Antecedents ===
Maillardet's automaton (invented c. 1800) drawing a picture

Automation of art dates back at least to the automata of ancient Greek civilization, when inventors such as Daedalus and Hero of Alexandria were described as designing machines capable of writing text, generating sounds, and playing music. Such automatons have flourished throughout history, such as Maillardet's automaton, created around 1800 and capable of drawing and writing.

Also in the 19th century, Ada Lovelace wrote that "computing operations" could potentially be used to generate music and poems. In 1950, Alan Turing's paper "Computing Machinery and Intelligence" focused on whether machines can mimic human behavior convincingly. Shortly after, the academic discipline of artificial intelligence was founded at a research workshop at Dartmouth College in 1956.

Since its founding, AI researchers have explored philosophical questions about the nature of the human mind and the consequences of creating artificial beings with human-like intelligence; these issues have previously been explored by myth, fiction, and philosophy since antiquity.

=== 1950s to 2000s ===
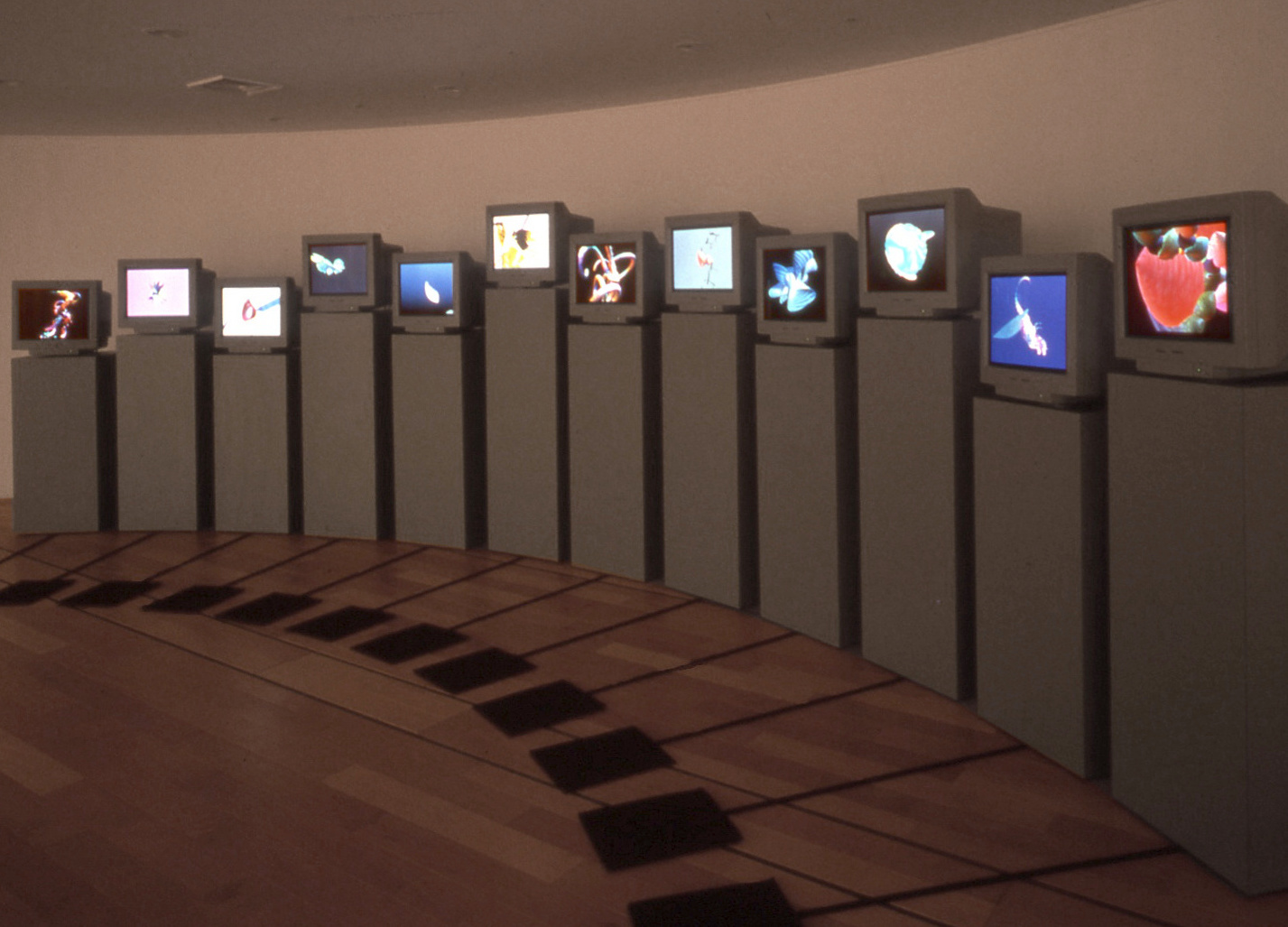
Karl Sims' Galápagos installation allowed visitors to evolve 3D animated forms.

Since the founding of AI in the 1950s, artists have used artificial intelligence to create artistic works. These works were sometimes referred to as algorithmic art, computer art, digital art, or new media art.

One of the first significant AI art systems is AARON, developed by Harold Cohen beginning in the late 1960s at the University of California at San Diego. AARON uses a symbolic rule-based approach to generate technical images in the era of GOFAI programming, and it was developed by Cohen with the goal of being able to code the act of drawing. AARON was exhibited in 1972 at the Los Angeles County Museum of Art. From 1973 to 1975, Cohen refined AARON during a residency at the Artificial Intelligence Laboratory at Stanford University. In 2024, the Whitney Museum of American Art exhibited AI art from throughout Cohen's career, including re-created versions of his early robotic drawing machines.

Karl Sims has exhibited art created with artificial life since the 1980s. He received an M.S. in computer graphics from the MIT Media Lab in 1987 and was artist-in-residence from 1990 to 1996 at the supercomputer manufacturer and artificial intelligence company Thinking Machines. In both 1991 and 1992, Sims won the Golden Nica award at Prix Ars Electronica for his videos using artificial evolution. In 1997, Sims created the interactive artificial evolution installation Galápagos for the NTT InterCommunication Center in Tokyo. Sims received an Emmy Award in 2019 for outstanding achievement in engineering development.

In 2014, Stephanie Dinkins began working on Conversations with Bina48. For the series, Dinkins recorded her conversations with BINA48, a social robot that resembles a middle-aged black woman. In 2019, Dinkins won the Creative Capital award for her creation of an evolving artificial intelligence based on the "interests and culture(s) of people of color."

In 2015, Sougwen Chung began Mimicry (Drawing Operations Unit: Generation 1), an ongoing collaboration between the artist and a robotic arm. In 2019, Chung won the Lumen Prize for her continued performances with a robotic arm that uses AI to attempt to draw in a manner similar to Chung.

=== AI boom ===
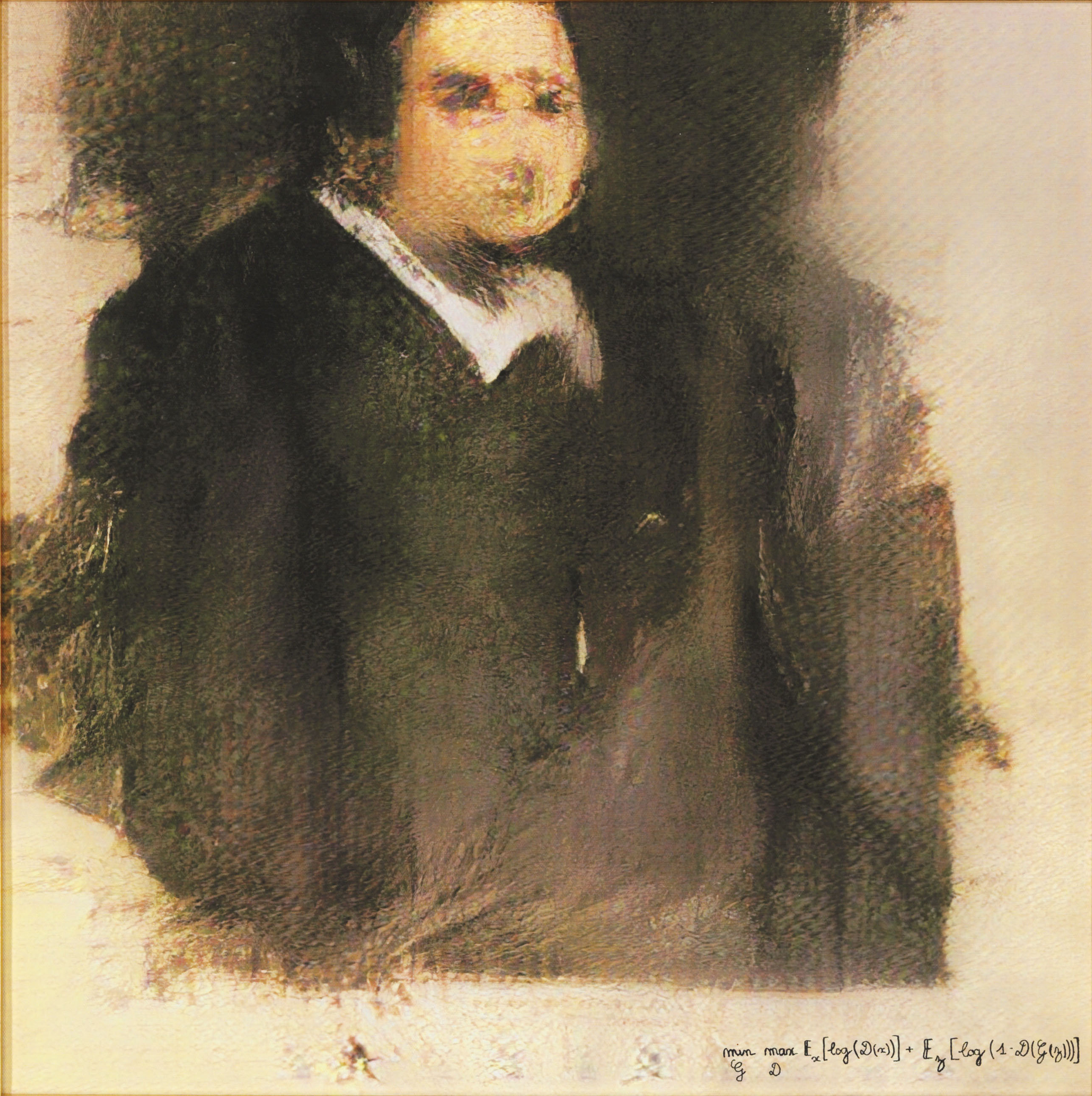
Edmond de Belamy, created with a generative adversarial network in 2018

In 2018, an auction sale of artificial intelligence art was held at Christie's in New York where the AI artwork Edmond de Belamy sold for US$432,500, which was almost 45 times higher than its estimate of US$7,000–10,000. The artwork was created by Obvious, a Paris-based collective.

In 2024, Japanese film generAIdoscope was released. The film was co-directed by Hirotaka Adachi, Takeshi Sone, and Hiroki Yamaguchi. All video, audio, and music in the film were created with artificial intelligence.

In 2025, the Japanese anime television series Twins Hinahima was released. The anime was produced and animated with AI assistance during the process of cutting and conversion of photographs into anime illustrations and later retouched by art staff. Most of the remaining parts such as characters and logos were hand-drawn with various software.

=== Technical history ===
Deep learning, characterized by its multi-layer structure that attempts to mimic the human brain, first came about in the 2010s, causing a significant shift in the world of AI art. During the deep learning era, there are mainly these types of designs for generative art: autoregressive models, diffusion models, GANs, normalizing flows.

In 2014, Ian Goodfellow and colleagues at Université de Montréal developed the generative adversarial network (GAN), a type of deep neural network capable of learning to mimic the statistical distribution of input data such as images. The GAN uses a "generator" to create new images and a "discriminator" to decide which created images are considered successful. Unlike previous algorithmic art that followed hand-coded rules, generative adversarial networks could learn a specific aesthetic by analyzing a dataset of example images.

In 2015, a team at Google released DeepDream, a program that uses a convolutional neural network to find and enhance patterns in images via algorithmic pareidolia. The process creates deliberately over-processed images with a dream-like appearance reminiscent of a psychedelic experience. Later, in 2017, a conditional GAN learned to generate 1000 image classes of ImageNet, a large visual database designed for use in visual object recognition software research. By conditioning the GAN on both random noise and a specific class label, this approach enhanced the quality of image synthesis for class-conditional models.

Autoregressive models were used for image generation, such as PixelRNN (2016), which autoregressively generates one pixel after another with a recurrent neural network. Immediately after the Transformer architecture was proposed in Attention Is All You Need (2018), it was used for autoregressive generation of images, but without text conditioning.

The website Artbreeder, launched in 2018, uses the models StyleGAN and BigGAN to allow users to generate and modify images such as faces, landscapes, and paintings.

In the 2020s, text-to-image models, which generate images based on prompts, became widely used, marking yet another shift in the creation of AI-generated artworks.

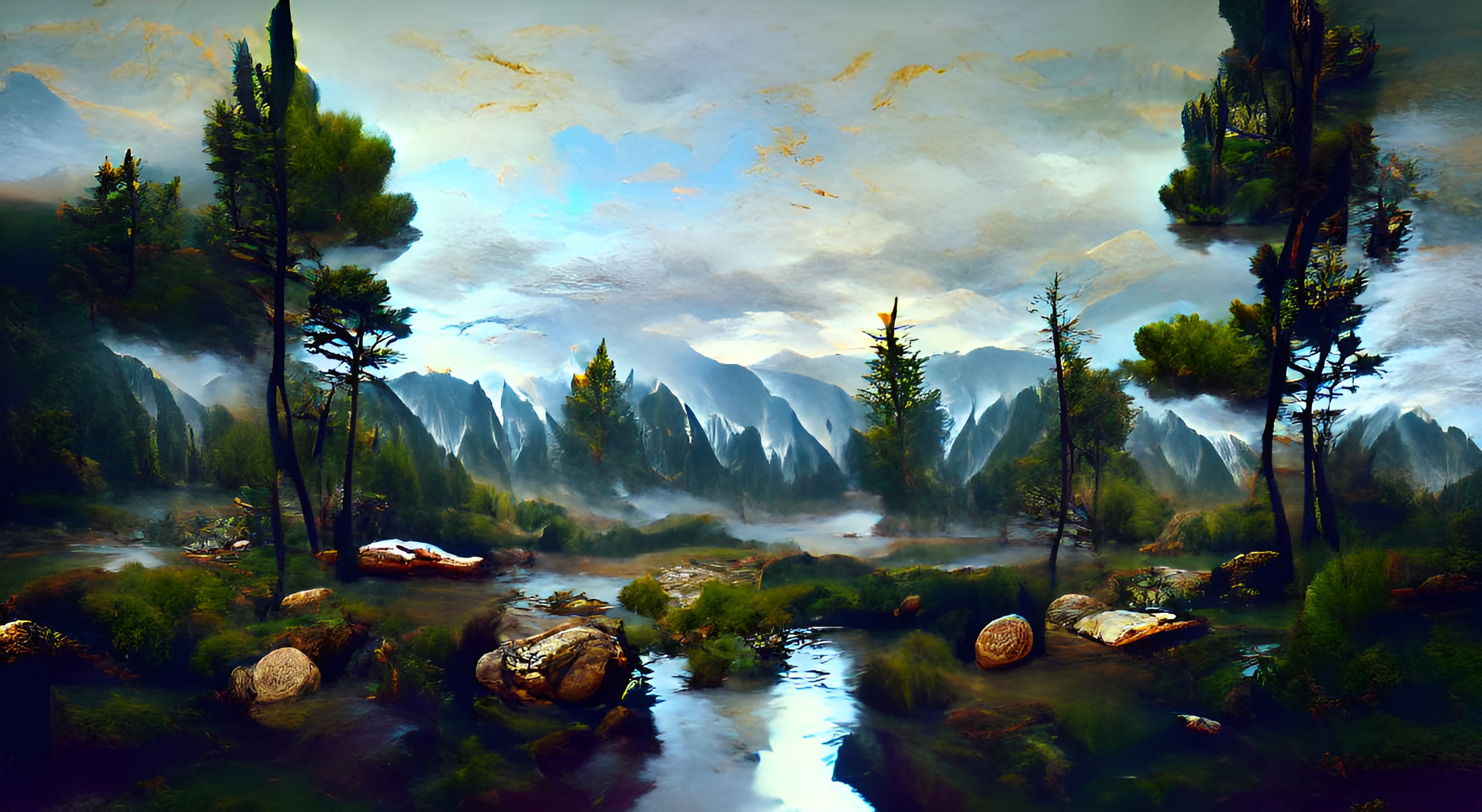
Example of an image made with VQGAN-CLIP (NightCafe Studio, March 2023)

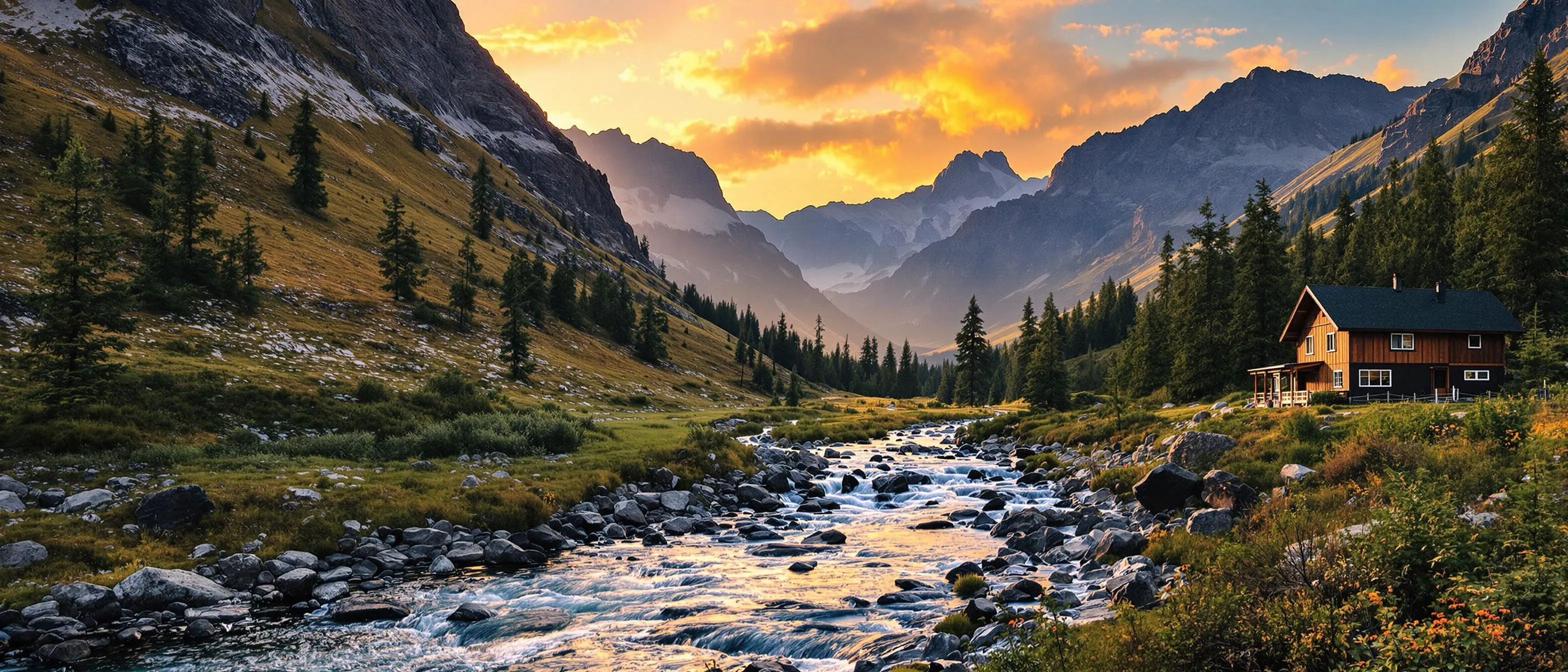
Example of an image made with Flux 1.1 Pro in Raw mode (November 2024); this mode is designed to generate photorealistic images

In 2021, using the influential large language generative pre-trained transformer models that are used in GPT-2 and GPT-3, OpenAI released a series of images created with the text-to-image AI model DALL-E 1. It is an autoregressive generative model with essentially the same architecture as GPT-3. Along with this, later in 2021, EleutherAI released the open source VQGAN-CLIP based on OpenAI's CLIP model. Diffusion models, generative models used to create synthetic data based on existing data, were first proposed in 2015, but they only became better than GANs in early 2021. Latent diffusion model was published in December 2021 and became the basis for the later Stable Diffusion (August 2022), developed through a collaboration between Stability AI, CompVis Group at LMU Munich, and Runway.

In 2022, Midjourney was released, followed by Google Brain's Imagen and Parti, which were announced in May 2022, Microsoft's NUWA-Infinity, and the source-available Stable Diffusion, which was released in August 2022. DALL-E 2, a successor to DALL-E, was beta-tested and released (with the further successor DALL-E 3 being released in 2023). Stability AI has a Stable Diffusion web interface called DreamStudio, plugins for Krita, Photoshop, Blender, and GIMP, and the Automatic1111 web-based open source user interface. Stable Diffusion's main pre-trained model is shared on the Hugging Face Hub.

Ideogram was released in August 2023, this model is known for its ability to generate legible text.

In 2024, Flux was released. This model can generate realistic images and was integrated into Grok, the chatbot used on X (formerly Twitter), and Le Chat, the chatbot of Mistral AI. Flux was developed by Black Forest Labs, founded by the researchers behind Stable Diffusion. Grok later switched to its own text-to-image model Aurora in December of the same year. Several companies, along with their products, have also developed an AI model integrated with an image editing service. Adobe has released and integrated the AI model Firefly into Premiere Pro, Photoshop, and Illustrator. Microsoft has also publicly announced AI image-generator features for Microsoft Paint. Along with this, some examples of text-to-video models of the mid-2020s are Runway's Gen-4, Google's VideoPoet, OpenAI's Sora, which was released in December 2024, and LTX-2 which was released in 2025.

In 2025, several models were released. GPT Image 1 from OpenAI, launched in March 2025, introduced new text rendering and multimodal capabilities, enabling image generation from diverse inputs like sketches and text. MidJourney v7 debuted in April 2025, providing improved text prompt processing. In May 2025, Flux.1 Kontext by Black Forest Labs emerged as an efficient model for high-fidelity image generation, while Google's Imagen 4 was released with improved photorealism. Flux.2 debuted in November 2025 with improved image reference, typography, and prompt understanding.

== Tools and processes ==
=== Approaches ===
There are many approaches used by artists to develop AI visual art. When text-to-image is used, AI generates images based on textual descriptions, using models like diffusion or transformer-based architectures. Users input prompts and the AI produces corresponding visuals. When image-to-image is used, AI transforms an input image into a new style or form based on a prompt or style reference, such as turning a sketch into a photorealistic image or applying an artistic style. When image-to-video is used, AI generates short video clips or animations from a single image or a sequence of images, often adding motion or transitions. This can include animating still portraits or creating dynamic scenes. When text-to-video is used, AI creates videos directly from text prompts, producing animations, realistic scenes, or abstract visuals. This is an extension of text-to-image but focuses on temporal sequences.

=== Imagery ===
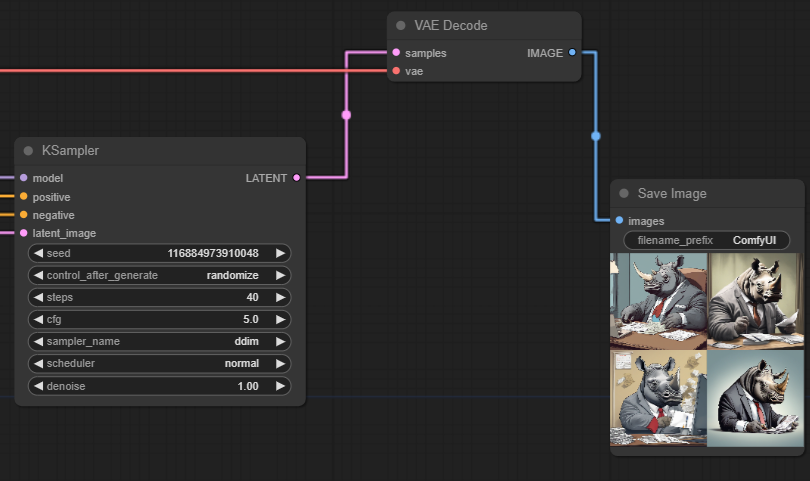
Example of a usage of ComfyUI for Stable Diffusion XL. People can adjust variables (such as CFG, seed, and sampler) needed to generate image.

There are many tools available to the artist when working with diffusion models. They can define both positive and negative prompts, but they are also afforded a choice in using (or omitting the use of) VAEs, LoRAs, hypernetworks, IP-adapter, and embedding/textual inversions. Artists can tweak settings like guidance scale (which balances creativity and accuracy), seed (to control randomness), and upscalers (to enhance image resolution), among others. Additional influence can be exerted during pre-inference by means of noise manipulation, while traditional post-processing techniques are frequently used post-inference. People can also train their own models.

In addition, procedural "rule-based" image generation techniques have been developed, utilizing mathematical patterns, algorithms that simulate brush strokes and other painterly effects, as well as deep learning models such as generative adversarial networks (GANs) and transformers. Several companies have released applications and websites that allow users to focus exclusively on positive prompts, bypassing the need for manual configuration of other parameters. There are also programs capable of transforming photographs into stylized images that mimic the aesthetics of well-known painting styles.

There are many options, ranging from simple consumer-facing mobile apps to Jupyter notebooks and web UIs that require powerful GPUs to run effectively. Additional functionalities include "textual inversion," which refers to enabling the use of user-provided concepts (like an object or a style) learned from a few images. Novel art can then be generated from the associated word(s) (the text that has been assigned to the learned, often abstract, concept) and model extensions or fine-tuning (such as DreamBooth).

=== Impact and applications ===
AI has the potential for a societal transformation, which may include enabling the expansion of non-commercial niche genres (such as cyberpunk derivatives like solarpunk) by amateurs, novel entertainment, fast prototyping, increasing art-making accessibility, and artistic output per effort or expenses or time—e.g., via generating drafts, draft-definitions, and image components (inpainting). Generated images are sometimes used as sketches, low-cost experiments, inspiration, or illustrations of proof-of-concept-stage ideas. Additional functionalities or improvements may also relate to post-generation manual editing (i.e., polishing), such as subsequent tweaking with an image editor.

Professional visual artists and designers used generative AI in early-stage conceptualization (divergent thinking) more than final production (convergent thinking) and practices producing digital or ephemeral outputs (e.g., UI/UX design, concept art) more readily integrate these than those producing physical, permanent artifacts (e.g., sculpture, architecture). In physical domains, concerns regarding structural integrity, material constraints, and cultural "ethno-computation" often limit AI to a "complementary enhancement" role rather than a substitute for production. Furthermore, attitudes toward adoption vary significantly by career stage, with entry-level professionals viewing generative AI as a pragmatic extension of digital tools necessary for market competitiveness, whereas senior practitioners often express critical skepticism regarding the devaluation of embodied expertise and long-term skill development.

=== Prompt engineering and sharing ===
Prompts for some text-to-image models can also include images and keywords and configurable parameters, such as artistic style, which is often used via keyphrases like "in the style of [name of an artist]" in the prompt /or selection of a broad aesthetic/art style. There are platforms for sharing, trading, searching, forking/refining, or collaborating on prompts for generating specific imagery from image generators. Prompts are often shared along with images on image-sharing websites such as Reddit and AI art-dedicated websites. A prompt is not the complete input needed for the generation of an image; additional inputs that determine the generated image include the output resolution, random seed, and random sampling parameters.

==== Related terminology ====
Synthetic media, which includes AI art, was described in 2022 as a major technology-driven trend that will affect business in the coming years. Harvard Kennedy School researchers voiced concerns about synthetic media serving as a vector for political misinformation soon after studying the proliferation of AI art on the X platform. Synthography is a proposed term for the practice of generating images that are similar to photographs using AI.

== Criticism ==
A symbol expressing opposition to AI

Despite adoption in certain circles, AI image generation remains artistically and ethically controversial. Notably, many, if not most, images generated by AI are typically considered to be "slop", lacking in any of the genuine cultural value indicative of legitimate works of art. Attempts to use AI in established creative spaces have been met with public and professional backlash in favor of the legitimacy and authenticity offered by human art.

AI visual content also inherits many of the criticisms targeted at wider usage of generative AI, such as reliance on data centers or use for exploitative or non-consensual AI pornography.

=== Classification as "art" ===
The usage of the label "art" when it applies to works generated by AI software has led to debate among artists, philosophers, scholars, and others. Various observers argue that referring to machine generated images as "art" undermines the traditional characteristics of human artistry, such as creativity, skill, and intentionality. Present-day definitions of true artistic creation often put an emphasis on the requirement of human-level intentions, personal experience and emotion, as well as historical and/or artistic context.

According to a research study from the National Library of Medicine, humans inherently show a bias against artwork described as being AI-generated. When participants of the study were shown two comparable images, with only one presented as having been generated by AI, subjects were more likely to rate the one described as being artificially generated lower in artistic value. This suggests that social and cultural attitudes can shape the determination of whether an image is considered art, regardless of the image's other visual features.

In a 2023 report submitted to the Annual Convention of Digital Art Observers, Samuel Loomis wrote that the term "AI art" acknowledges its dual nature as a product of human guidance and machine-driven generative systems, when evaluating it by the same critical standards applied to traditional art.

== Analysis of existing art using AI ==
In addition to the creation of original art, research methods that use AI have been generated to quantitatively analyze digital art collections. This has been made possible due to the large-scale digitization of artwork in the past few decades. According to CETINIC and SHE (2022), using artificial intelligence to analyze already-existing art collections can provide new perspectives on the development of artistic styles and the identification of artistic influences.

Two computational methods, close reading and distant viewing, are the typical approaches used to analyze digitized art. Close reading focuses on specific visual aspects of one piece. Some tasks performed by machines in close reading methods include computational artist authentication and analysis of brushstrokes or texture properties. In contrast, through distant viewing methods, the similarity across an entire collection for a specific feature can be statistically visualized. Common tasks relating to this method include automatic classification, object detection, multimodal tasks, knowledge discovery in art history, and computational aesthetics. Synthetic images can also be used to train AI algorithms for art authentication and to detect forgeries.

Researchers have also introduced models that predict emotional responses to art. One such model is ArtEmis, a large-scale dataset paired with machine learning models. ArtEmis includes emotional annotations from over 6,500 participants along with textual explanations. By analyzing both visual inputs and the accompanying text descriptions from this dataset, ArtEmis enables the generation of nuanced emotional predictions.

== Other forms of AI art ==
AI has also been used in arts outside of visual arts. Generative AI has been used to create music, as well as in video game production beyond imagery, especially for level design (e.g., for custom maps) and creating new content (e.g., quests or dialogue) or interactive stories in video games. AI has also been used in the literary arts, such as helping with writer's block, inspiration, or rewriting segments. In the culinary arts, some prototype cooking robots can dynamically taste, which can assist chefs in analyzing the content and flavor of dishes during the cooking process.

== Copyright status ==
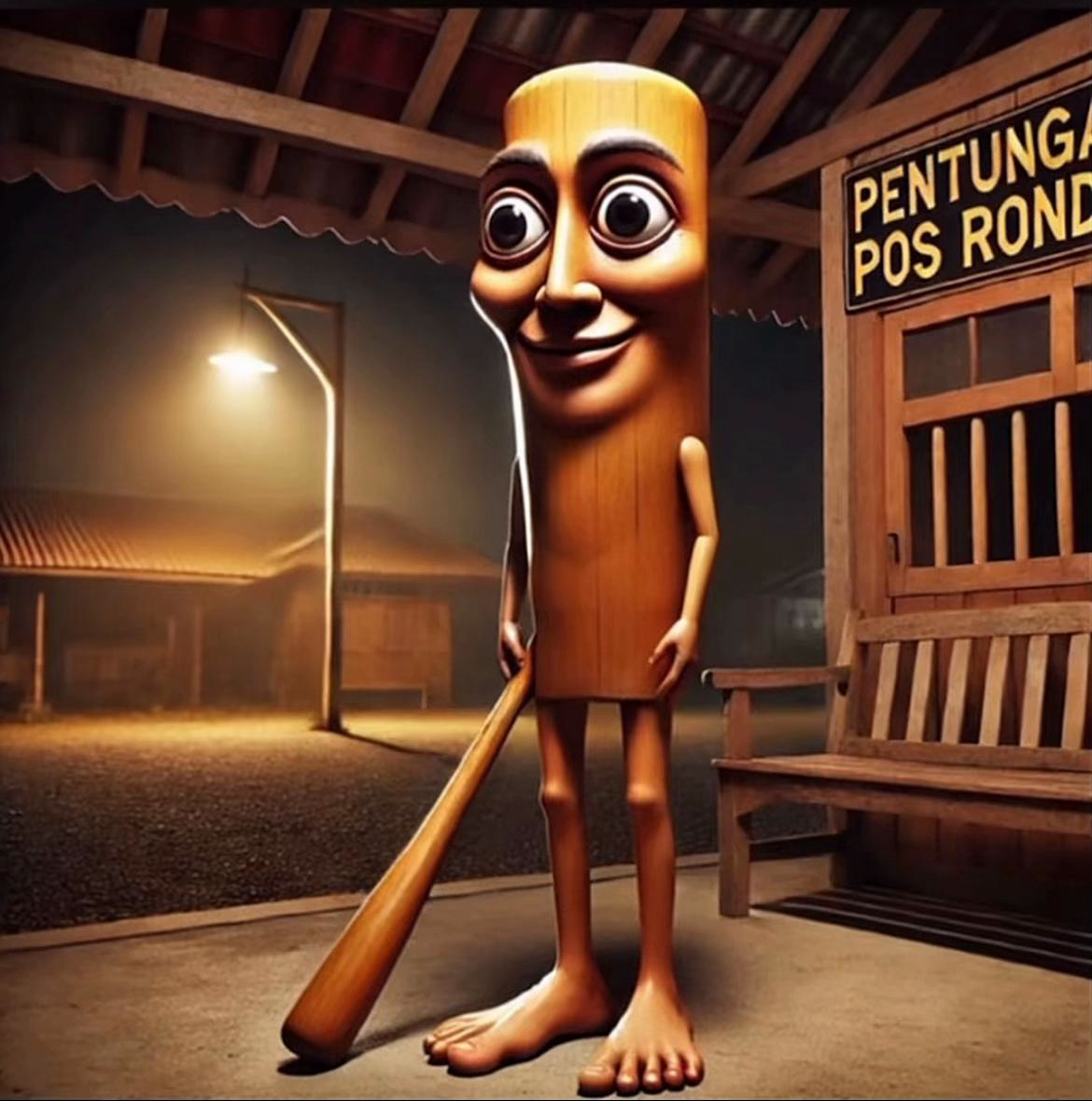
In late 2025, the original prompter of the AI Tung Tung Tung Sahur character, Noxa, and the French agency Mementum Lab started claiming ownership over the character and legally threatening others who used the figure. Since it was generated by AI, the character is public domain, which led the creators of Steal a Brainrot to sue Mementum Lab. Legal proceedings are still ongoing.

In the 2020s, the rapid advancement of deep learning-based generative AI models raised questions about the copyright status of AI-generated works, and about whether copyright infringement occurs when such are trained or used. This includes text-to-image models such as Stable Diffusion and large language models such as ChatGPT. State of the art large language models are trained on all the data which can be scraped from the Internet, often utilizing copyrighted material. As of 2023, there were several pending U.S. lawsuits challenging the use of copyrighted data to train AI models, with defendants arguing that this falls under fair use.

== See also ==
- Algorithmic art
- AI slop
- Applications of artificial intelligence § Art
- Artificial intelligence and elections
- Artificial intelligence controversies
- Artificial intelligence in architecture
- Computational creativity
- Cybernetic art
- Deepfake
- Generative art
- List of artificial intelligence artists
- Artificial intelligence in music
- Neural style transfer
- Synthetic media
- Augmented Intelligence (Christies)
