= Colleen Hoffenbacker =

American artist

- Born: July 16, 1970
- Education: Western Washington University; Academy of Classical Design; New Masters Academy
- Occupation: Artist
- Known for: Painting, Artificial intelligence art
- Movement: Contemporary art
- Website: colleenhoffenbacker.com

Colleen Hoffenbacker (born 1970) is an American artist who became one of the first painters to receive U.S. copyright registration for AI‑assisted art created through human authorship, meeting the threshold for protection under current copyright law in 2023. Her registration has since been cited in legal commentary as an early example of how human authorship can be recognized in AI-assisted creative work. She explores the transformation of natural motifs through digital mediation and studio-based interpretation, engaging with discussions about the evolving role of the artist in algorithmically influenced creation. Hoffenbacker lives and maintains her studio practice in the Pacific Northwest, near the Seattle metropolitan area, a region shaped by contemporary digital innovation.

== Biography ==
Hoffenbacker received a BA in Fine and Studio Art and an MA in Education from Western Washington University. Early in her career, she worked in commercial art with a focus on analog and digital production, experience that later informed her studio practice. She received classical training at the Academy of Classical Design (formerly Mims Studios) and refined her approach through instruction with master artists and training with New Masters Academy, integrating observational discipline with digital and later generative technologies.

Hoffenbacker's work was selected for inclusion in the Lunar Codex, a cultural archive included on multiple missions to the Moon occurring between 2022 and 2027. She is listed in Who’s Who in America for her contributions to the field of art. Her work has appeared in regional and international publications, including Cascadia Daily News, New Visionary Magazine, Create! Magazine, Divide Magazine, Art Seen Magazine, Women United Art Magazine, Suboart Magazine, Modern Renaissance Magazine, Visual Art Journal, Artist Closeup Magazine, and Artsin Square Magazine.

Hoffenbacker holds professional memberships in several art organizations. She is a Member with Distinction of American Women Artists, an Elected Member of Allied Artists of America, and a member of Women Painters of Washington.

== Career ==
Hoffenbacker’s work engages natural and botanical forms that are transformed through digital mediation. Her paintings emerge from a hybrid generative process that combines traditional oil painting with generative artificial intelligence. In this framework, organic visual structures are digitally refracted and reinterpreted before being resolved in paint, reflecting an interplay between analog and computational modes of making. Hoffenbacker’s compositions modulate between inherited natural pattern and the perceptual logic of algorithmic systems, positioning AI as an algorithmic collaborator integrated into the development of the work.

In a 2025 article on evolving creative tools and authorship frameworks, Lori Mazor—author of TEMPERATURE: Creativity in the Age of AI—referenced Hoffenbacker’s registration as part of a broader guide for artists navigating copyright considerations in AI-enhanced work.

Hoffenbacker is part of a cohort of artists exploring AI-integrated practices, including Kris Kashtanova, Takashi Murakami, Refik Anadol, Anna Ridler, and Sofia Crespo. Her placement within this movement has been noted by the Center for Art Law, while The Gradient has examined the broader field, highlighting artists such as Jason M. Allen and Sougwen Chung for their contributions to the discourse.

Hoffenbacker’s painting, Regen 1.0.2, debuted in Emergence, a virtual exhibition organized by Visionary Art Collective and launched in 2023 during the final phase of the COVID-19 pandemic. The presentation introduced her work developed through AI‑enhanced processes, which she later registered with the U.S. Copyright Office, positioning it within emerging discussions of digital authorship and online display.

A second work from the series, Floragen 2.0.2, was included in Fresh Paint (December 15, 2023 – January 31, 2024), a curated exhibition by Create! Magazine organized by Margaret Winslow, Curator of Contemporary Art at the Delaware Art Museum.

These virtual formats, developing alongside AI-driven practices and shaped by documentation related to the COVID-19 pandemic’s impact on the arts, contributed to broader experimentation with VR, mobile, and browser-based exhibition platforms.

== See also ==
- Artificial intelligence and copyright
- Artificial intelligence visual art
- Some Living American Women Artists (collage)
