= Lists of artificial intelligence topics =

The following is a list of pages that contain entries relating to artificial intelligence:

- List of AI-assisted software development tools
- List of artificial intelligence algorithms
- List of artificial intelligence artists
- List of artificial intelligence books
- List of artificial intelligence companies
- List of artificial intelligence films
- List of artificial intelligence institutions
- List of artificial intelligence journals
- List of artificial intelligence projects
- List of artificial intelligence tools in audio-based healthcare diagnostics
- List of mathematical discoveries by artificial intelligence
- Lists of open-source artificial intelligence software
- List of presidents of the Association for the Advancement of Artificial Intelligence
- List of programming languages for artificial intelligence
- List of proprietary artificial intelligence software
- List of university artificial intelligence research centers

== See also ==
- Glossary of artificial intelligence
- Outline of artificial intelligence
