= Arab Bank Switzerland =

Private Bank

Arab Bank (Switzerland) Ltd.
- Type: Private bank (subsidiary)
- Industry: Financial services
- Founded: 1962; 64 years ago
- Headquarters: Geneva, Switzerland
- Key people: Wahbe Tamari (Chairman), Yves Spörri (CEO), Jean-Pierre Daccache (Deputy CEO), Rani Jabban (Deputy CEO), Serge Robin (former CEO)
- Services: Wealth management, commodity trade finance, digital assets
- Number of employees: ~300 (2024)
- Parent: Sister company of Arab Bank
- Website: arabbank.ch

Arab Bank Switzerland, commonly known as ABS, is a Swiss private bank headquartered in Geneva. The bank is supervised by the Swiss Financial Market Supervisory Authority (FINMA) and is an independent sister company of Arab Bank plc, one of the largest banks in the Middle East.

ABS provides wealth management, commodity trade finance, treasury and digital asset services. As of mid-2026, the ABS Group had close to USD 25 billion in assets under management.

== History ==
Arab Bank Switzerland was established in Zurich in 1962 with a second branch in Geneva opening in 1964. The bank's headquarters were later relocated to Geneva.

In November 2022, Arab Bank Switzerland acquired a majority stake in Gonet & Cie, a Geneva-based private bank founded in 1845.

In November 2024, Gonet & Cie and ONE swiss bank announced plans to merge, creating an entity overseeing approximately CHF 12 billion in assets under management. The merged bank was to operate under the Gonet brand, led by CEO Jean-René Lepezel. The merger received FINMA approval and came into effect in mid-2025.

In 2025, the ABS Group acquired the former Lombard Odier headquarters at Place de Longemalle in Geneva to consolidate its two entities, Arab Bank Switzerland and Gonet, under one roof.

The new headquarters comprises approximately 8,000 square metres and is expected to accommodate 450 to 500 staff when occupied in 2028.

== Offices ==
Arab Bank Switzerland is headquartered in Geneva, with representative offices in Lebanon and in Dubai.

In November 2024, Arab Bank Switzerland received in-principle approval from the Abu Dhabi Global Market (ADGM) Registration Authority for a Financial Services Permission to conduct advisory activities.

In June 2026, the bank launched ABS (Middle East) Limited in the Dubai International Financial Centre (DIFC), appointing Samir Atitallah as chief executive officer of the new entity.

== Operations ==
ABS offers wealth management services to high-net-worth individuals, family offices and institutional clients, primarily from the Middle East and Europe. The bank also provides commodity trade finance and treasury services.

=== Wealth Management ===
In 2026, ABS became the first Swiss bank to implement Avaloq's integration with BlackRock's Aladdin Wealth platform for portfolio management and client reporting.

ABS entered real estate investment through a strategic partnership with the Steiner Group, investing in development projects including the MixCity mixed-use project in Renens, Vaud, and the Quarzup commercial complex in Vernier, Geneva.

=== Digital Assets ===
In 2019, ABS partnered with Swiss digital asset infrastructure firm Taurus to begin offering cryptocurrency custody and brokerage services for Bitcoin and Ethereum, making it one of the earlier Swiss private banks to enter the digital asset space.

In January 2022, the bank expanded its digital asset offering to include ten decentralised finance (DeFi) tokens, as well as staking services. In 2025, ABS partnered with XBTO to launch a Bitcoin yield product for wealth management clients.

== Sponsorships ==
=== ABS Digital Art Prize ===
In 2023, Arab Bank Switzerland launched the ABS NFT Art Prize, later renamed the ABS Digital Art Prize, an annual award for digital art created using non-fungible token (NFT) technology. The 2023 prize was won by Marjan Moghaddam. The 2024 edition was awarded to Geneva-based artist RVig (Richard Vigniel) for his generative work Fleurs du Mal, inspired by Charles Baudelaire's poetry collection. In 2025, Anna Ridler and Sofia Crespo won the Artist of the Year category.

=== Bol d'Or du Léman ===
In 2025, Arab Bank Switzerland became a sponsor of the Bol d'Or du Léman, an annual sailing regatta on Lake Geneva.

=== IMA Design Award ===
The Impact Award, sponsored by Arab Bank Switzerland, is a category of the Institut du monde arabe (IMA) Design Award that recognises designers and projects contributing to social, environmental and economic impact in the Arab world.
