= List of artificial intelligence artists =

Many notable artificial intelligence artists have created a wide variety of artificial intelligence art from the 1960s to today. These include:

== 20th century ==
- Harold Cohen, active from 1960s to 2010s. Cohen's work is primarily with AARON, a series of computer programs that autonomously create original images.
- Eric Millikin, active from 1980s to present. Millikin's work includes AI-generated virtual reality, video art, poetry, music, and performance art, on topics such as animal rights, climate change, anti-racism, witchcraft, and the occult.
- Karl Sims, active from 1980s to present. Sims is best known for using particle systems and artificial life in computer animation.

== 21st century ==
- Refik Anadol, active from 2010s to present. Anadol's work includes video installations based on generative algorithms with artificial intelligence.
- Sougwen Chung, active from 2010s to present. Chung's work includes performances with a robotic arm that uses AI to attempt to draw in a manner similar to Chung.
- Stephanie Dinkins, active from 2010s to present. Dinkins' work includes recordings of conversations with an artificially intelligent robot that resembles a black woman, discussing topics such as race and the nature of being.
- Jake Elwes, active from 2010s to present. Their practice is the exploration of artificial intelligence, queer theory and technical biases.
- Libby Heaney, active from 2010s to present. Heaney's practice includes work with chatbots.
- Mario Klingemann, active from 2010s to present. Klingemann's works examine creativity, culture, and perception through machine learning and artificial intelligence.
- Mauro Martino, active from 2010s to present. Martino's work includes design, data visualization and infographics.
- Trevor Paglen, active from 2000s to present. Paglen's practice includes work in photography and geography, on topics like mass surveillance and data collection.
- Anna Ridler, active from 2010s to present. Ridler works with collections of information, including self-generated data sets, often working with floral photography.
