= Fooocus =

Open source generative artificial intelligence UI

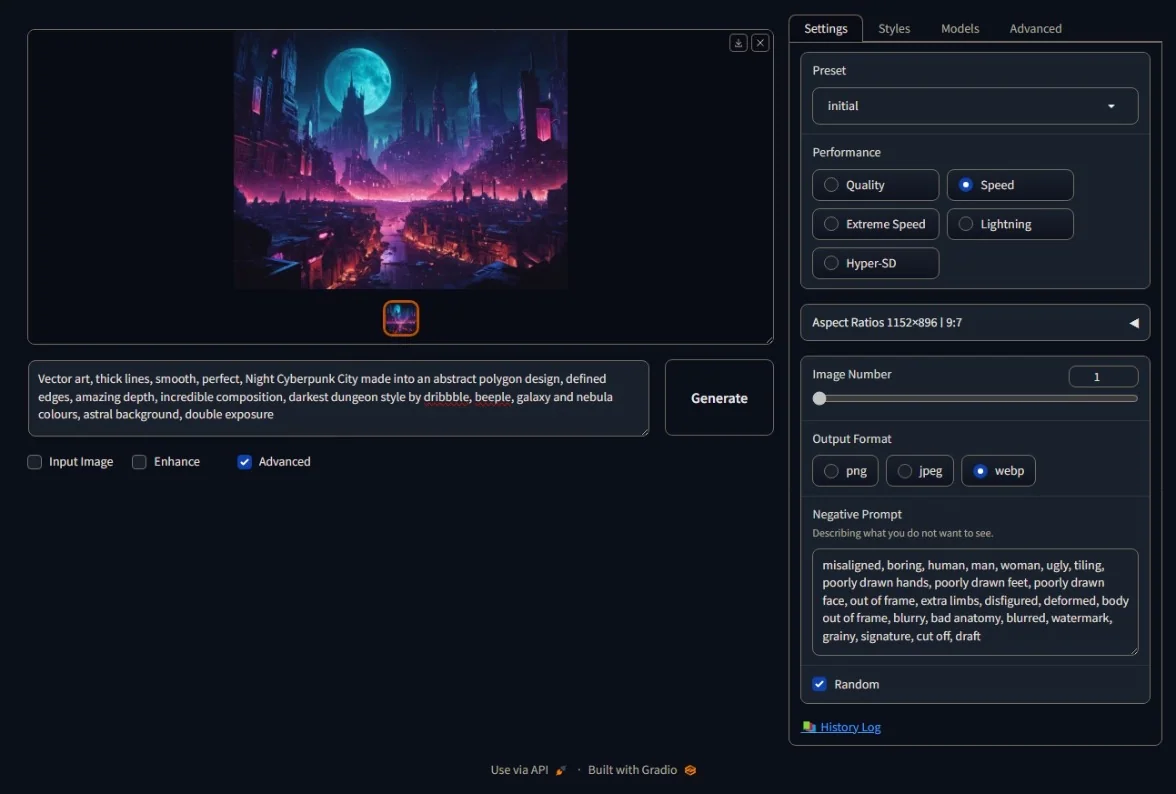
- Original author: Lvmin Zhang
- Initial release: August 9, 2023; 2 years ago
- Repository: github.com/lllyasviel/Fooocus
- Written in: Python
- License: GPLv3
- Website: github.com/lllyasviel/Fooocus

Fooocus is an open source generative artificial intelligence program that allows users to generate images from a text prompt. It uses Stable Diffusion XL as the base model for its image capabilities as well as a collection of default settings and prompts to make the image generation process more streamlined.

== History ==
Fooocus was created by Lvmin Zhang, a doctoral student at Stanford University who previously studied at the Chinese University of Hong Kong and Soochow University. He is also the main author of ControlNet, which has been adopted by many other Stable Diffusion interfaces, such as AUTOMATIC1111 and ComfyUI. As of 9 July 2024, the project had 38.1k stars on GitHub.

== Features ==
Fooocus' main feature is that it is easy to set up and does not require users to manually configure model parameters to achieve desirable results. According to the project, it uses GPT-2 to automatically add more detail to the user's prompts. It includes common extensions such LCM low-rank adaptation by default which allows for faster generation speed. Fooocus prefers a photographic style by default, with a list of predefined styles to choose from. While Fooocus aims to provide good results out of the box, it also includes an "advanced" tab that allows for user customization. The user interface is based on Gradio.

It appears this project has not been updated in over 1 year. The latest git update for Fooocus was in Aug 12, 2024.
