= Civitai =

Generative AI platform

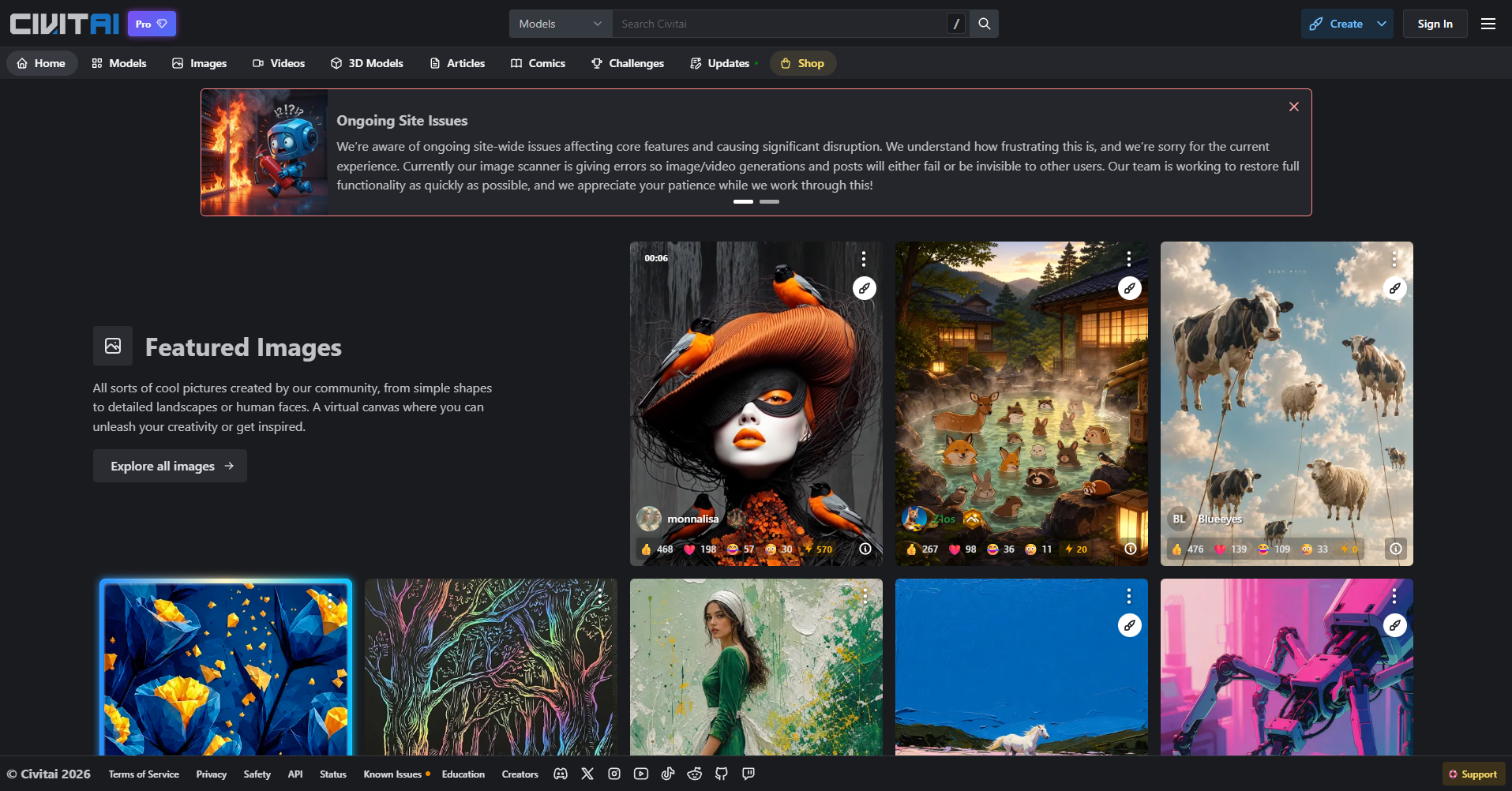
- Home page as of July 24, 2026
- Type: Private company
- Industry: Artificial intelligence
- Founded: 2022; 4 years ago
- Founders: Justin Maier
- Headquarters: Boise, Idaho
- Website: civitai.com

Civitai is an online platform and marketplace for generative artificial intelligence (Gen AI) content, primarily focused on AI-generated images and models, and AI-generated videos.

== History ==
Civitai was founded in 2022 by Justin Maier. By January 2023, the site reached 100,000 registered users and 3 million by November. In November 2023, Civitai secured funding from venture capital firm Andreessen Horowitz. By April 2024, Civitai had 23.2 million monthly accesses.

The company is headquartered in Boise, Idaho.

== Platform ==
Civitai allows users to share and download AI models, particularly those used for image generation. The platform supports various AI models, including Stable Diffusion and Flux, and provides a space for users to showcase and monetize their AI-generated content. Users have profile pages and can comment on other users' models and images.

The website also features a virtual currency called Buzz that can be used to generate images on Civitai's servers. Buzz can be bought or earned by engaging with the site.

The platform is open source under the Apache License.

== Controversies ==
In 2023, 404 Media reported that Civitai began a "Bounties" marketplace where users could commission deepfakes, of real or fake people. Users are rewarded with Buzz for completing Bounties.

In December 2023, AI provider OctoML announced it had ended its business relationship with Civitai after concerns were raised users were generating images that “could be categorized as child pornography.”
