= ComfyUI =

Open source generative artificial intelligence UI

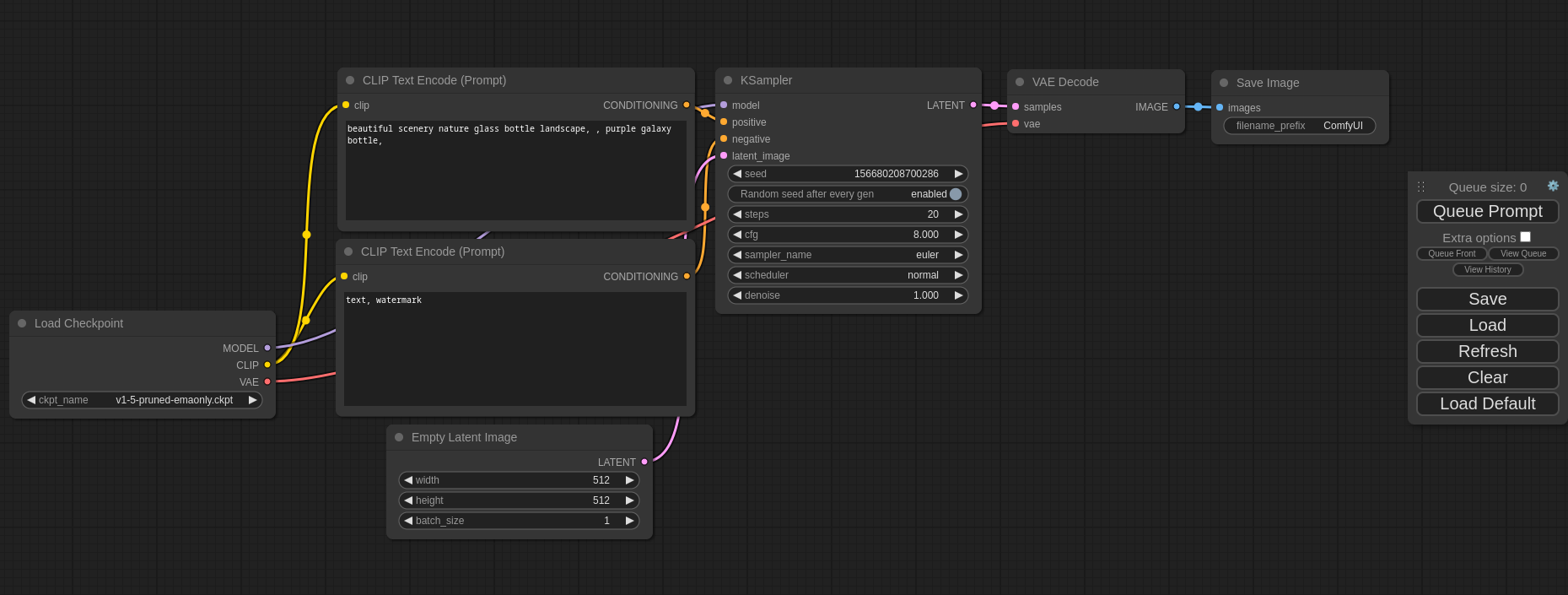
- Original author: comfyanonymous
- Release: January 16, 2023; 3 years ago
- Stable release: 0.43.0
- Written in: Python
- License: GPLv3
- Website: www.comfy.org
- Repository: github.com/Comfy-Org/ComfyUI

ComfyUI is an open-source, node-based program that allows users to generate images from a series of text prompts. It uses free diffusion models such as Stable Diffusion as the base model for its image capabilities combined with other tools such as ControlNet and LCM low-rank adaptation, with each tool being represented by a node in the program.

== History ==
ComfyUI was released on GitHub in January 2023. According to comfyanonymous, the creator, a major goal of the project was to improve on existing software designs in terms of the user interface. The creator had been involved with Stability AI, but by 3 June 2024 that involvement had ended, and an organization called Comfy Org had been created along with the core developers. In July 2024, Nvidia announced support for ComfyUI within its RTX Remix modding software. In August 2024, support was added for the Flux diffusion model developed by Black Forest Labs, and Comfy Org joined the Open Model Initiative created by the Linux Foundation. As of July 2026, the project has 122k stars on GitHub. ComfyUI is one of the most popular user interfaces for Stable Diffusion, along with Automatic1111.

== Features ==
ComfyUI's main feature is that it is node-based. Each node has a function such as "Model loader" or "CLIP Text Encode". The nodes are connected to form a control-flow graph called a workflow. When a prompt is queued, a highlighted frame appears around the currently executing node, starting from "load checkpoint" and ending with the final image and its save location. Workflows commonly consist of tens of nodes, forming a complex directed acyclic graph. Node types include loading a model, specifying prompts, samplers, schedulers, VAE decoders, face restoration and upscaling models, LoRAs, embeddings, and ControlNets.

Several samplers are supported, such as Euler, Euler_a, dpmpp_2m_sde and dpmpp_3m_sde. Workflows can be saved to a file, allowing users to re-use node workflows and share them with other users. The file format for the workflows is in JSON and can be embedded in the generated images. Users have also created custom extensions to the base system, which are exposed as new nodes, such as the extension for AnimateDiff, which aims to create videos. ComfyUI has been described as more complex compared to other diffusion UIs such as Automatic1111. A default node group is also included with the program.

As of December 2024, 1,674 nodes were supported. ComfyUI Supports multiple text-to-image models, including Stable Diffusion, Flux and Tencent's Hunyuan-DiT, as well as custom models from Civitai like Pony.

== LLMVision extension compromise ==
In June 2024, a hacker group called "Nullbulge" compromised an extension of ComfyUI to add malicious code to it. The compromised extension, called ComfyUI_LLMVISION, was used for integrating the interface with AI language models GPT-4 and Claude 3, and was hosted on GitHub. Nullbulge hosted a list of hundreds of ComfyUI users' login details across multiple services on its website, while users of the extension reported receiving numerous login notifications. vpnMentor conducted security research on the extension and claimed it could "steal crypto wallets, screenshot the user’s screen, expose device information and IP addresses, and steal files that contain certain keywords or extensions".

Nullbulge's website claims they targeted users who committed "one of our sins", which included AI-art generation, art theft, promoting cryptocurrency, and any other kind of theft from artists such as from Patreon. They claimed that they were "a collective of individuals who believe in the importance of protecting artists' rights and ensuring fair compensation for their work" and that they believed that "AI-generated artwork is detrimental to the creative industry and should be discouraged".
