= List of artificial intelligence tools in audio-based healthcare diagnostics =

This page covers some of the diagnostics tools and scribing tools in healthcare using generative AI but with specific focus on tools extracting audio data from various sources including sensors, consensual recordings of speech or biological sounds.

The list spans tools across all stages of maturity right from pre-clinical research prototypes to FDA-cleared or CE-marked commercial products. Entries are organised by primary clinical domain. The time-frame for this compilation spans tools launched between January 2013 and December 2025. It does not yet reflect tools launched in 2026.

== Respiratory health ==
Includes tools that use cough, breath, or lung sounds for screening, diagnosis or monitoring of respiratory conditions such as asthma, COPD, pneumonia, or tuberculosis.

Tool	One-line Description	Developer	Country	Year	Audio Input	Deployment	Regulatory Status	Key Validation
Swaasa	AI-powered cough analysis app for respiratory disease screening	Salcit Technologies	India	2017	Sound (Cough)	App, API (B2B, B2C)	India-CDSCO, ISO 13485, ISO 27001, HIPAA; Canada-Therapeutic Products Directorate; US(FDA)-Centre for Devices and Radiological Health; EU- Medical Device Regulation; Australia- TGA	Scientific Reports (2023)
CoughPro	Passive cough monitoring and tracking app for chronic cough management	Hyfe Inc.	USA	2022	Sound (Cough)	App (B2C, B2B)	EU- GDPR, Australia- Privacy Act	Scientific Reports (2025)
ResAppDx	Smartphone-based cough diagnostic tool acquired and integrated by Pfizer	ResApp Health (acq. Pfizer, 2022)	Australia	2015	Sound (Cough)	API, telehealth platform (B2B)	EU- CE Mark, GDPR; AU- TGA, Privacy Act; Global- ISO 13485, IEC 62304	SMARTCOUGH-C 2 trial, European Respiratory Journal (2021)
LungPass	Bluetooth stethoscope app for AI lung auscultation at home	Healthy Networks OU (ChestPal Ltd)	Estonia	2021	Sound (Bluetooth stethoscope for auscultation sounds)	App + Device (B2C)	EU- CE Mark, GDPR; Global- ISO 13485, IEC 62304, HIPAA	European Respiratory Journal (2021)
Voicemed.io	Multi-modal voice, breath, and cough biomarker platform for respiratory monitoring	VoiceMed	Luxembourg / Italy	2020	Voice + Sound (Vocal task and breathing sounds)	App (B2B, B2C)	None (pre-clinical)	Chiesi Group pilot (2026)

== Mental health ==
Includes voice and speech biomarker tools validated or designed for depression, anxiety, bipolar disorder, PTSD, or general mental wellness screening.

Tool	One-line Description	Developer	Country	Year	Audio Input	Deployment	Regulatory Status	Key Validation
Kintsugi Voice	Voice biomarker API for depression and anxiety detection in primary care (now open-sourced)	Kintsugi Mindful Wellness, Inc. (ceased commercial ops 2026; open-sourced)	USA	2019	Voice (Free form speech)	App (B2C), API (B2B)	Prior to open-sourcing: HIPAA, GDPR, SOC 2 Type II	Annals of Family Medicine (2025)
Sonde Health	Vocal biomarker SDK for mental health and respiratory fitness screening	Sonde Health, Inc.	USA	2020	Voice (Speech and phonation)	API (B2B)	HIPAA, GDPR, SOC 2	Frontiers in Psychiatry (2024)
Ellipsis Health	AI analysis of call audio for depression and anxiety severity scoring	Ellipsis Health	USA	2020	Voice (conversational)	API, App (B2B)	HIPAA, GDPR, SOC 2 Type II, AI Ethics Policy	JMIR AI (2025)

== Neurological health ==
Includes speech and language analysis tools used for cognitive decline, Parkinson's disease, Alzheimer's, ALS, aphasia or other neurological and neurodegenerative conditions.

Tool	One-line Description	Developer	Country	Year	Audio Input	Deployment	Regulatory Status	Key Validation
TELL App (Toolkit to Examine Lifelike Language)	Speech-based neurolinguistic assessment toolkit for cognitive and neurological research	Adolfo M. García et al. / Sigmind; Global Brain Health Institute	Argentina / International	2023	Voice (Standard speech tasks)	Web app (B2B, research)	None	Behavior Research Methods (2023)
Canary Ambient/Speech	Enterprise speech analytics for neurological condition detection including Huntington's	Canary Speech Inc	USA, Utah	2014	Voice (Conversational)	Enterprise API	HIPAA, GDPR	Huntington's Disease study, Beth Israel Deaconess Medical Center
Enuncia.ai	Mobile speech biomarker app for neurological and communication disorder assessment	Enuncia.ai	Germany	2022	Voice + Sounds	Mobile app	GDPR	None found
Winterlight Labs (now Cambridge Cognition)	Speech-based cognitive assessment platform for Alzheimer's and dementia research	Winterlight Labs Inc.	Canada	2015	Voice (Standard speech tasks)	Trials/Research	None	Alzheimer's & Dementia: Diagnosis, Assessment & Disease Monitoring

== Cardiovascular health ==
Includes tools using heart sounds, lung sounds or voice biomarkers associated with cardiac conditions such as arrhythmias, murmurs, heart failure, or hypertension.

Tool	One-line Description	Developer	Country	Year	Audio Input	Deployment	Regulatory Status	Key Validation
Eko Health	AI-powered digital stethoscope and ECG platform for cardiac murmur and arrhythmia detection	Eko Health	USA	2013	Sounds (Heart/lung sounds + ECG)	Device + App (B2B, B2C)	FDA cleared (murmur, AFib, low EF, EFAST model); EU- CE Mark, UKCA Mark; Global- MDSAP, ISO 13485	TRICORDER study, The Lancet (2025)
Vocalis Health	Voice biomarker platform for cardiovascular and respiratory remote monitoring	Vocalis Health (merger of Beyond Verbal + Healthymize)	USA	2019	Voice (Free speech)	SDK, web portal (B2B)	CE Mark (COVID-19 screening)	Mayo Clinic collaboration studies
Beyond Verbal	Emotion and wellness analytics via voice intonation (merged into Vocalis Health 2019)	Beyond Verbal Communication Ltd. (acq. by Vocalis Health, 2019)	Israel	2012	Voice (Free form speech)	API (B2B); consumer apps Moodie, Empath	None	Mayo Clinic collaboration studies
AiSteth	AI Bluetooth stethoscope for cardiac and lung auscultation in low-resource settings	Ai Health Highway India Pvt. Ltd.	India	2019	Sounds (Heart/lung sounds)	Device + App (B2B, B2C)	CDSCO, HIPAA	NITI Aayog Frontier Tech Hub

== Hearing health ==
Includes AI-enhanced hearing aids, audiometric screening apps, sound therapy platforms and tools that analyse ambient sound for hearing loss management or rehabilitation.

Tool	One-line Description	Developer	Country	Year	Audio Input	Deployment	Regulatory Status	Key Validation
Widex SoundSense Learn / MySound	Machine learning hearing aid personalisation using real-world ambient sound feedback	Widex (now part of WS Audiology)	Denmark	2018	Sounds (Ambient sound capture)	Hearing aid + App (B2C via audiologist)	CE Mark, FDA (hearing aid class)	Internal Widex clinical studies
Oticon Intent	Hearing aid with 4D biometric sensors that adapts to user intent and listening environment	Oticon (Demant Group)	Denmark	2024	Sounds (Ambient sound + 4D biometric sensors)	Hearing aid (B2C via audiologist)	CE Mark, FDA (hearing aid class)	Oticon Intent white paper (2024)
AudioCardio	Consumer app delivering personalised sound therapy for hearing health and tinnitus	AudioCardio Inc.	USA	2019	Sounds	App (B2C)	None	Hearing Tracker coverage

== Clinical documentation ==
Includes ambient AI scribes, clinical speech recognition tools and call-audio documentation systems used by clinicians for note generation (these are not diagnostic tools).

Tool	One-line Description	Developer	Country	Year	Audio Input	Deployment	Regulatory Status	Key Validation
Augnito	AI clinical speech recognition and documentation platform for healthcare enterprises	Scribetech India Healthcare Pvt. Ltd.	India / UK	2020	Voice (clinician dictation)	App, Desktop, API (B2B, B2C)	HIPAA, GDPR, ISO 27001; India- CDSCO	Augnito white paper: Enhancing clinician efficiency
Heidi Health	AI medical scribe that transcribes and structures clinical consultations in real time	Heidi Health	Australia	2019	Voice (consultation audio)	Web, App, API (B2B, B2C)	HIPAA, GDPR, NHS, Australia- APP	Comparison study, Clinical Endoscopy (2023)
IFLYHEALTH	China's leading healthcare AI platform using voice interaction and speech recognition for clinical documentation, AI-assisted diagnosis, and chronic disease management	Xunfei Healthcare Technology Co. Ltd (subsidiary of iFLYTEK)	China	2016	Voice (clinician dictation + patient voice interaction)	Enterprise B2B	China NMPA; CMMI Level 5 DEV 2.0	No peer-reviewed English paper found
Nuance Dragon Medical One	Enterprise cloud-based clinical speech recognition used widely across hospital systems	Nuance Communications (subsidiary of Microsoft)	USA	2013	Voice (clinician dictation)	Enterprise API, desktop (B2B)	HIPAA, SOC 2, ISO 27001, HITRUST	Journal of the American Medical Informatics Association (2024)
Tortus	Ambient AI consultation recorder and note generator for UK NHS clinical settings	Tortus	UK	2024	Voice (consultation audio)	App (B2B)	GDPR, NHS DTAC	Pilot programmes with Great Ormond Street Hospital / NHS Trusts
Eleos Health	AI documentation tool for behavioural health therapy session notes and outcomes	Eleos Health	USA	2025	Voice (consultation audio)	App (B2B)	HIPAA	Randomised controlled trial, Journal of Medical Internet Research (2023)
VoiceOC	Automated patient call transcription and documentation for administrative workflows	VoiceOC	USA	2019	Voice (patient call audio)	API, telephony (B2B)	None (administrative tool)	Allure Medical case study
Sunoh.ai	Ambient AI scribe for outpatient consultations with EHR integration	Sunoh.ai	USA	2024	Voice (consultation audio)	App, API (B2B, B2C)	HIPAA, SOC 2 Type II	Esperanza Health Centers case study
Lyrebird Health	AI clinical note generation from consultation audio for Australian clinicians	Lyrebird Health	Australia	2022	Voice (consultation audio)	App (B2B, B2C)	Australia-APP, GDPR	No peer-reviewed clinical validation study identified
Vitalyzer.in	AI assistant that interprets medical report audio for patients in India	Vitalyzer	India	2025	Voice (medical report narration audio)	App (B2C)	None	No peer-reviewed clinical validation study identified

== Foundation models ==
Includes large pre-trained audio or speech models specifically relevant to healthcare (open-source or proprietary).

Model	One-line description	Developer	Year	Audio Input	Access	Regulatory Status	Key Papers
HeAR (Health Acoustic Representations)	Google's large audio foundation model pre-trained on 300M+ health acoustic clips	Google Research	2024	Cough, breath, biological sounds	Open (Hugging Face, Google Cloud)	None (research model)	HeAR paper
EFAST	Eko-developed AI model for full cardiac assessment from digital stethoscope recordings	Eko Health	2025	Digital stethoscope recordings	Proprietary	FDA Cleared	TRICORDER study, The Lancet (2025)
HuBERT	Meta's self-supervised speech representation model trained on unlabelled audio	Meta AI	2020	Raw, unlabelled human speech	Open Source	Non-medical	wav2vec 2.0 (Meta Research)
Audio-PaLM	Google DeepMind multimodal model handling speech, text, and medical records	Google DeepMind	2024	Speech, Text, Medical Records	Enterprise cloud	Research model	Google Research
CLAP	Microsoft's contrastive audio-language model for environment and body sound understanding	Microsoft	2023	General environment and body sounds	Open Source	Non-medical	CLAP: Learning Audio Concepts from Natural Language Supervision

== Notes ==
- Kintsugi shut down commercial operations in 2025 after spending approximately $16 million on FDA regulatory submissions. Its voice biomarker models and scientific methodologies were open-sourced.
- Beyond Verbal was acquired by and merged into Vocalis Health in December 2019 and no longer operates as an independent product.
