= Artificial intelligence in architecture =

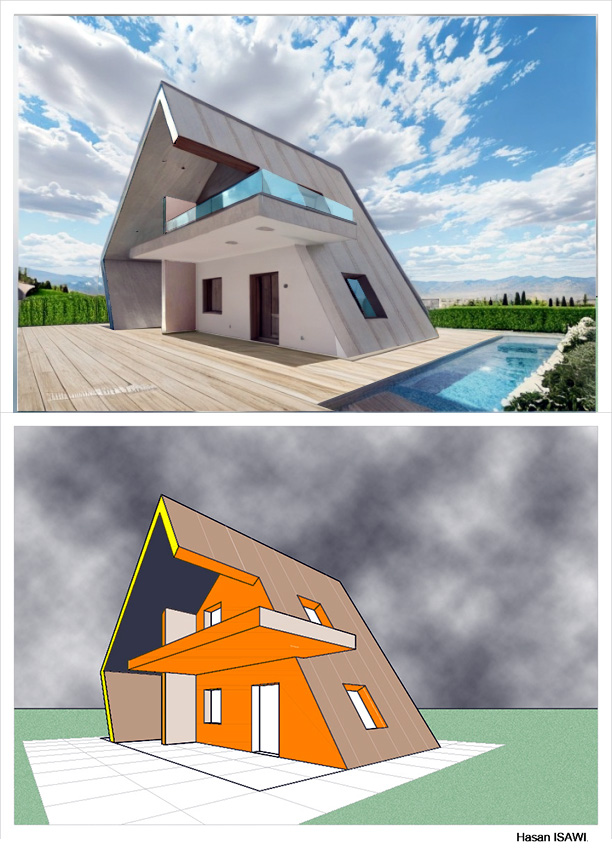
An AI-generated architectural illustration (top) derived from a simple 3D model (bottom)

Artificial intelligence in architecture is the use of artificial intelligence (AI) in automation, design, and planning in the architectural process or in assisting human skills in the field of architecture.

AI has been used by some architects for design, and has been proposed as a way to automate planning and routine tasks in the field.

== Implications ==
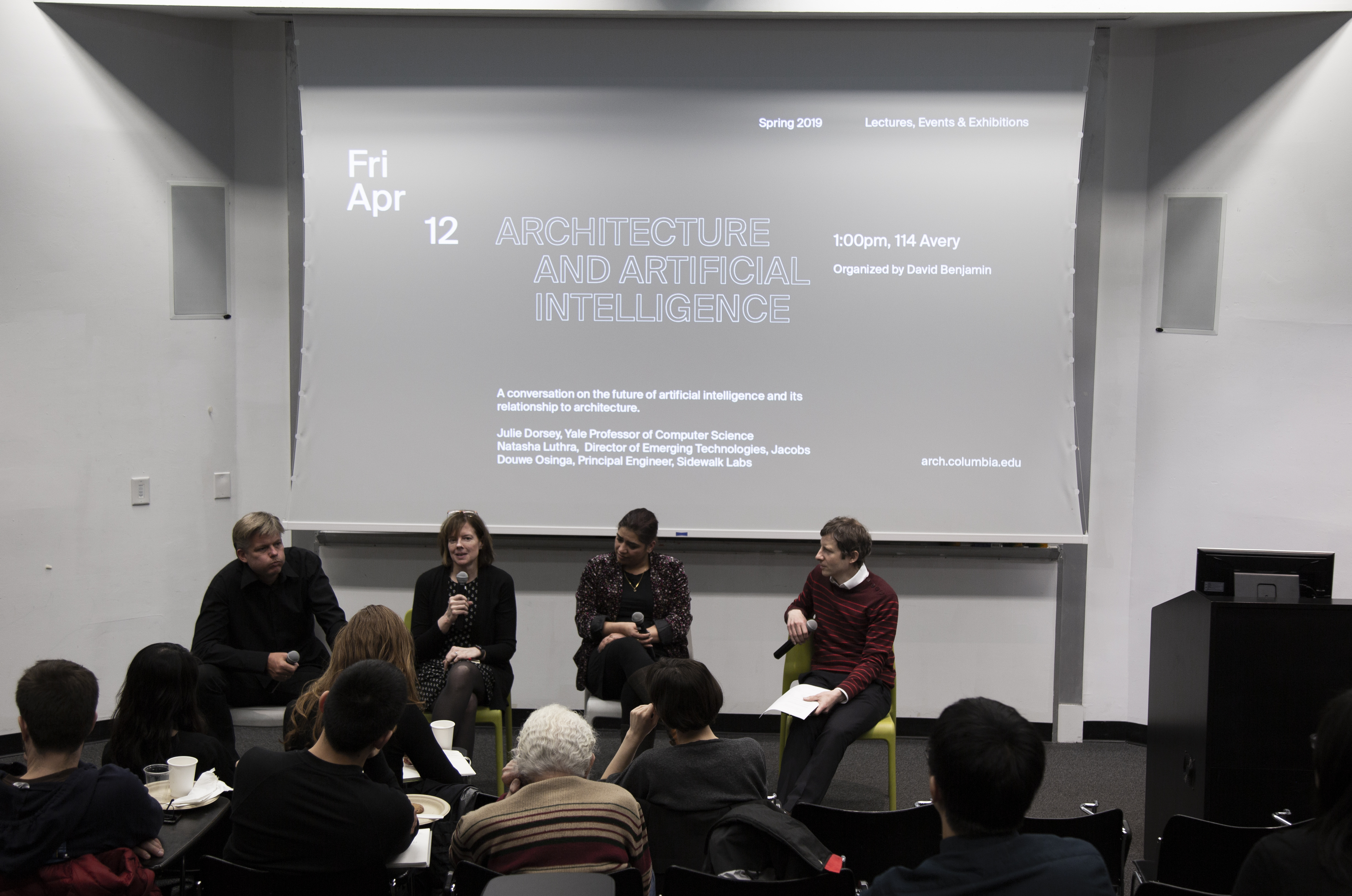
A discussion at Columbia University in 2019

=== Benefits ===
AI, according to ArchDaily, is said to potentially significantly augment the architectural profession through its ability to improve the design and planning process as well as increase productivity. Through its ability to handle large amounts of data, AI is said to potentially allow architects a range of design choices with criteria considerations such as budget, requirements adjusted to space, and sustainability goals calculated as part of the design process. This may allow for the design of optimized alternatives that can then undergo human review. AI tools are also said to potentially allow architects to assimilate urban and environmental data to inform their designs, streamlining initial stages of project planning and increasing efficiency and productivity.

Advances in generative design through the input of specific prompts allow architects to produce visual designs, including photorealistic images, and thus render and explore various material choices and spatial configurations. ArchDaily noted this could accelerate the creative process as well as allow for experimentation and sophistication in the design. Additionally, AI's capacity for pattern recognition and coding could aid architects in organizing design resources and developing custom applications, therefore enhancing the efficiency and collaboration between architects and AI.

AI is also thought to be able to contribute to the sustainability of buildings by analyzing various factors and following recommended energy-efficient modifications, thus pushing the industry toward greener practices. The use of AI in building maintenance, project management, and the creation of immersive virtual reality experiences are also thought of as potentially augmenting the architectural design process and workflow.

Examples include the use of text-to-image systems, such as Midjourney, to create detailed architectural images and the use of AI optimization systems, from companies such as Finch3D and Autodesk, to automatically generate floor plans from simple programmatic inputs. In contrast to digital-only creative practices, the high materiality of architectural outputs requires transitions from ephemeral digital files to permanent physical structures that are subject to strict safety regulations, material constraints, sensory intuition, and site-specific cultural contexts, making full automation difficult.

A prominent advocate of AI in architecture is architect Andrew Kudless, who in an interview with Dezeen said that he uses AI to innovate in architectural design by incorporating materials and scenes not usually present in initial plans, which he believes can significantly alter client presentations. He told Dezeen he believes one should show clients renderings from the onset, with AI assisting in this work, arguing that changes in design should be a positive aspect of the client-designer relationship by actively involving clients in the process. Additionally, Kudless highlighted AI's potential to facilitate labor in architectural firms, particularly in automating rendering tasks, thus reducing the workload on junior staff while maintaining control over the creative output.

=== Emergent aesthetics ===
In an interview for Dezeen's AItopia series, designer Tim Fu discussed the transformative potential of AI in architecture and proposed a future where AI could herald a "neoclassical futurist" style, blending the grandeur of classical aesthetics with futuristic design. Through his collaborative project, The AI Stone Carver, Fu showcased how AI can innovate traditional practices by generating design concepts that are then realized through human craftsmanship, such as stone carving by mason Till Apfel. This approach, he believed, celebrated the fusion of diverse architectural styles and emphasized the unique capabilities of AI in enhancing creative design processes.

Fu told Dezeen he envisions the integration of AI in design as a means to revive the ornamentation and detailed aesthetics characteristic of classical architecture, moving away from minimalism, which he said dominates contemporary architecture. He argued that AI's involvement in the ideation phase of design allows for a reversal in the roles of machine and human, enabling architects and designers to focus on creating more intricate and ornamental structures. Fu's optimistic outlook extended to the broader impact of AI on the architectural field, seeing it as an indispensable tool that will shift rather than replace human roles, enriching the field with innovative designs that pay homage to the beauty and qualities of classical architecture not present in contemporary architecture while embracing new technologies.

This perspective resonates with designers like Manas Bhatia, whose explorations similarly embrace generative AI as a co-creator and a medium to express ideas, blend architectural traditions, and speculate spatial futures.

Alongside practitioner-led image making, an academic discourse on machine learning in architecture developed from the mid-2010s. Contributors include Matias del Campo, co-founder with Sandra Manninger of the Vienna practice SPAN, who from the late 2010s applied neural networks, and later diffusion models, to architectural design at the University of Michigan's Taubman College, where he directed the Architecture and Artificial Intelligence Laboratory (AR²IL), founded in 2021. He co-edited with Neil Leach the Architectural Design issue Machine Hallucinations: Architecture and Artificial Intelligence (2022), guest-edited the 2024 issue Artificial Intelligence in Architecture, and authored Neural Architecture: Design and Artificial Intelligence (2022) and Diffusions in Architecture: Artificial Intelligence and Image Generators (2024). Del Campo describes AI as an epistemic shift for architecture rather than a tool, and has proposed the term "inferentialism" for a design approach based on statistical inference from large cultural datasets, which he contrasts with the closed, rule-based logic of parametricism.

=== Concerns ===
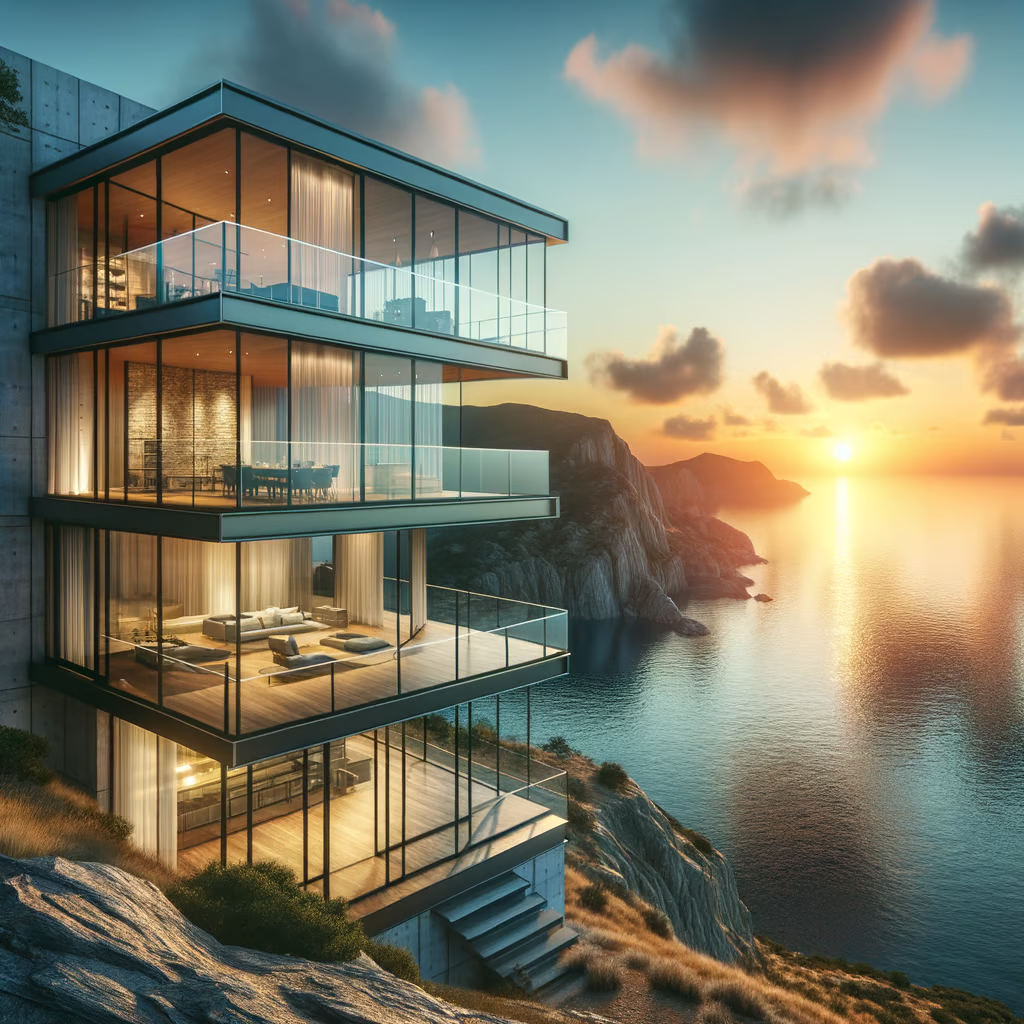
DALL-E 3 AI-generated architectural design

As AI's presence continues to expand across various industries, its impact on the architectural profession has become a topic of discussion. These discussions focus on how AI processes may influence traditional architectural practices, potentially altering job roles and shaping the nature of creativity. While AI-driven processes may increase efficiency in some aspects of the profession, they also raise questions about the potential loss of unique design perspectives. These thoughts have been countered by prominent creative figures in the realm of AI architecture, such as Tim Fu, Hassan Ragab, and Manas Bhatia, who have showcased the amplification of creativity in design and potential benefits in terms of restoring creative power to the designer.

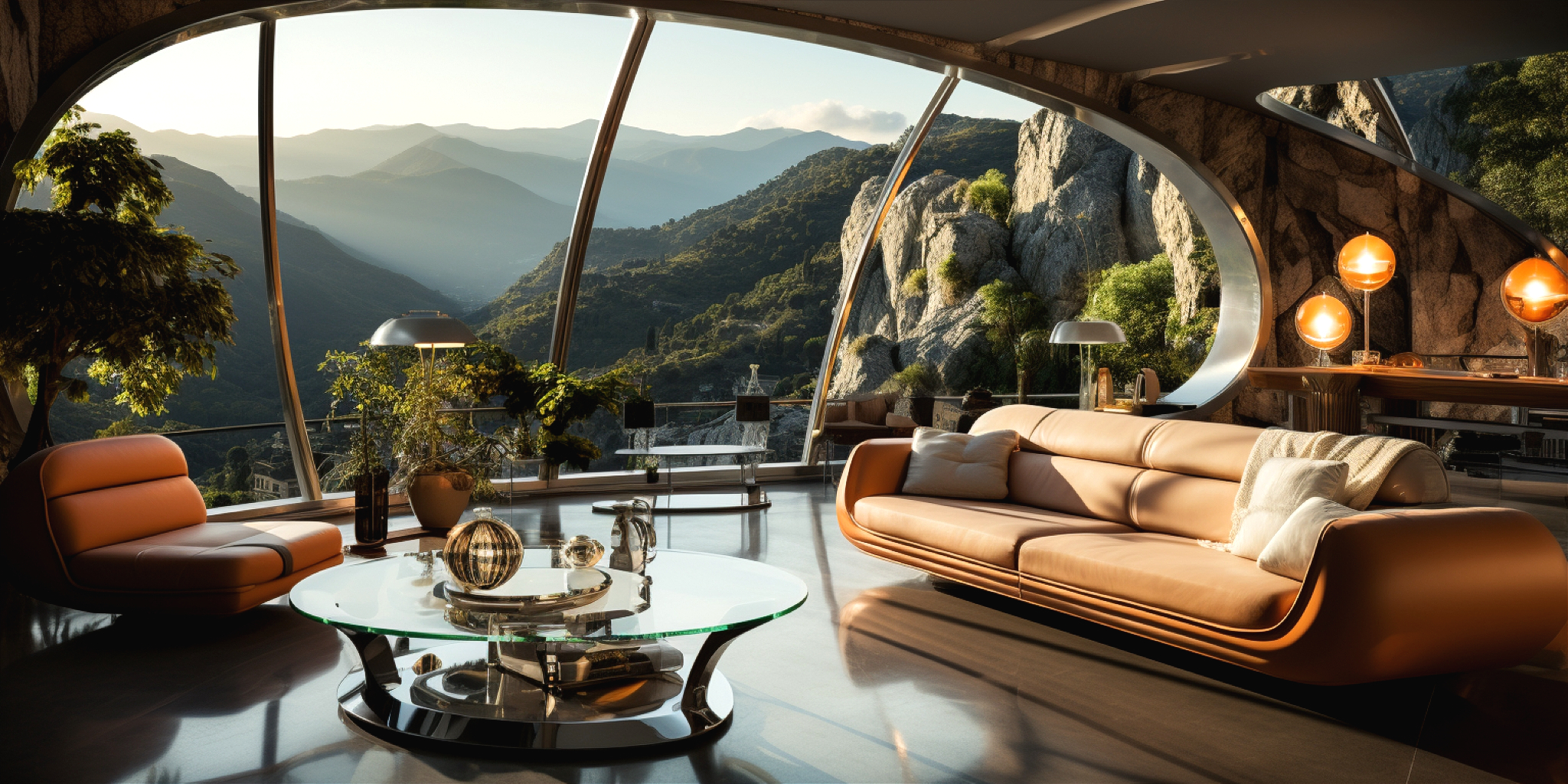
Interior architecture generated with Midjourney

A key concern is that AI-powered tools could diminish the need for human involvement in specific tasks traditionally performed by architects. This has led to speculation that the profession may increasingly shift toward roles focused on oversight, coordination, and strategic decision-making rather than hands-on design work.

In some design scenarios, algorithmically generated solutions can be adjusted to prioritize efficiency and cost-effectiveness, which some argue may overshadow the creative and contextual nuances that define individual architectural styles. As with any discipline, it has been determined that AI can be configured to provide beneficial results based on inputs and end goals the architect or designer assigns it.

There are also concerns about the potential for AI to exacerbate inequalities within the architectural profession. For example, larger firms with greater resources to invest in advanced AI technologies may gain a competitive edge over smaller firms and independent architects. This dynamic could contribute to industry consolidation, potentially limiting the diversity of architectural practice and stifling innovation. Ethical considerations in regard to cultural sensitivity have also been raised due to the datasets used to train AI. Without proper data vetting or implementation of failsafe overrides, AI-generated outcomes can trend toward overly documented and prioritized content.

== See also ==
- Open-source architecture
