= Flux (text-to-image model) =

Image-generating machine learning model

- An image generated with Flux.3 showing the text generation capabilities. Partial prompt:A poster of tranquil, sunlit mountain landscape in the style of a digital painting.
- Original author: Black Forest Labs
- Developer: Black Forest Labs
- Release: August 2024
- Stable release: Flux.3 (model series) / 23 July 2026
- Type: Text-to-image model
- License: Apache License (Schnell and Klein (2)); Flux Kommunity License (Klein 3); Non-commercial licence (Dev); Proprietary (Pro and Flex (2), Flux.3)
- Website: bfl.ai
- Repository: github.com/black-forest-labs/flux

Flux is a family of text-to-image and image-to-image models developed by Black Forest Labs (BFL), based in Freiburg im Breisgau, Germany. Black Forest Labs was founded by former employees of Stability AI. As with other text-to-image models, Flux generates images from natural language descriptions, called prompts. In addition, some Flux models support editing images.

== Black Forest Labs ==
Black Forest Labs (BFL) was founded in 2024 by Robin Rombach, Andreas Blattmann, and Patrick Esser, former employees of Stability AI, and seven others. Rombach, Blattmann and Esser had previously researched the artificial intelligence image generation at LMU Munich as research assistants under Björn Ommer. They had published their research results on image generation in April 2022, which resulted in creation of Stable Diffusion. Investors in BFL included venture capital firm Andreessen Horowitz, Brendan Iribe, Michael Ovitz, Garry Tan, and Vladlen Koltun. The company received an initial investment of US$31 million.

At the end of 2025, investor interest had risen dramatically including AMP, Salesforce Ventures, Samsung, Adobe, Deutsche Telekom, Canva offering USD 450 million. and BFL became a Delaware corporation. Investors are also customers able to use the AI for product images, advertising, brand design, e-commerce, and in Adobe Photoshop, for example

As of a Forbes article in June 2026, the company had 70 employees and was still considered a start-up, yet it has been competing against much better funded Silicon Valley companies.

In June 2026, film director Martin Scorsese joined BFL as an adviser, generating pushback from creative professionals and the Art Directors Guild. In August 2026, DLF reported that it had 100 employees. Thirty were already and another 30 would soon be based in San Francisco. Nevertheless, the company considers itself primarily as a research lab. In an interview the founders denied they were using data from LAION, but did not want to disclose which data and which data centres they use and what if any sustainability goals they were pursuing. Their "transparency hub" does not disclose the origin of their data.

== Development ==
In August 2024, Flux was integrated into Elon Musk's Grok chatbot developed by xAI and made available as part of premium feature on X (formerly Twitter). Four months later in December 2024, Grok switched to its own text-to-image model Aurora.

On 18 November 2024, Mistral AI announced that its Le Chat chatbot had integrated Flux Pro as its image generation model.

On 21 November 2024, BFL announced the release of Flux.1 Tools, a suite of editing tools designed to be used on top of existing Flux models. The tools consisting of Flux.1 Fill for inpainting and outpainting, Flux.1 Depth for control based on extracted depth map of input images and prompts, Flux.1 Canny for control based on extracted canny edges of input images and prompts, and Flux.1 Redux for mixing existing input images and prompts. Each tools are available in both Pro and Dev models.

In January 2025, BFL announced a partnership with Nvidia for inclusion of Flux models as foundation models for Nvidia's Blackwell microarchitecture. The company also announced the release of Flux Pro Finetuning API, designed for customisation and fine-tuning of Flux-generated images and a partnership with German media company Hubert Burda Media for usage of Flux Pro as part of content creation.

On 29 May 2025, BFL announced Flux.1 Kontext, a suite of models that enable in-context image generation and editing, allowing users to prompt with both text and images. Alongside this, BFL Playground, an interface for testing Flux models was released.

On 31 July 2025, BFL announced Flux.1 Krea Dev, a model developed in collaboration with Krea AI that trained to achieve better performance, more varied aesthetics, and better realism compared to existing text-to-image models.

In September 2025, Adobe Inc. announced that Photoshop (beta) users can use Flux.1 Kontext Pro as a model for its generative fill tool. BFL collaborated with Meta on Vibes, a video-generation app.

On 25 November 2025, BFL announced the release of Flux.2 model series, consisting of Pro, Flex, Dev, and Apache 2.0-licensed Klein (meaning Little or Small in German language) models along with Flux.2 variational autoencoder which also released as open-source software under Apache 2.0 licence. This series claimed improvements for image reference, photorealism, typography, and prompt understanding.

On 23 July 2026, BFL announced the release of Flux.3 model series, including video, image, and Action (a model for robotics). The smaller Klein model was released on 15 October.

== Models ==
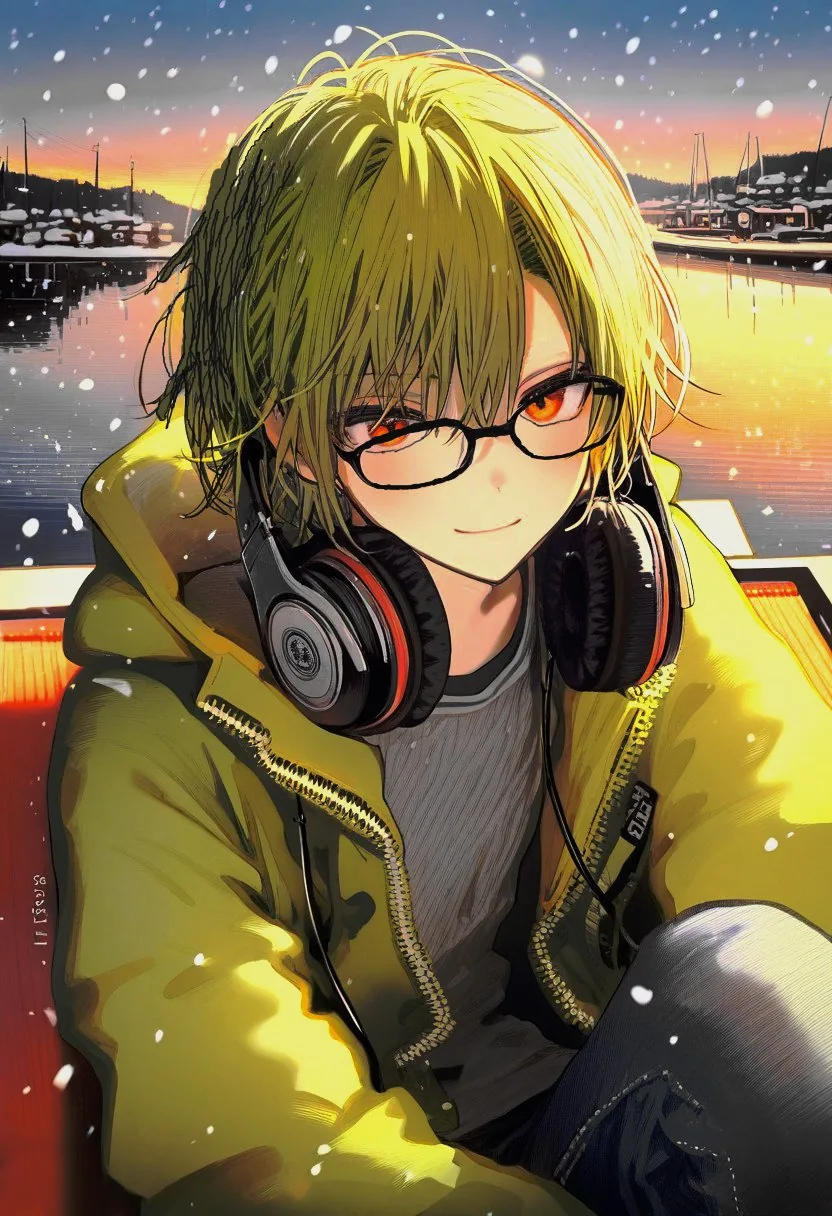
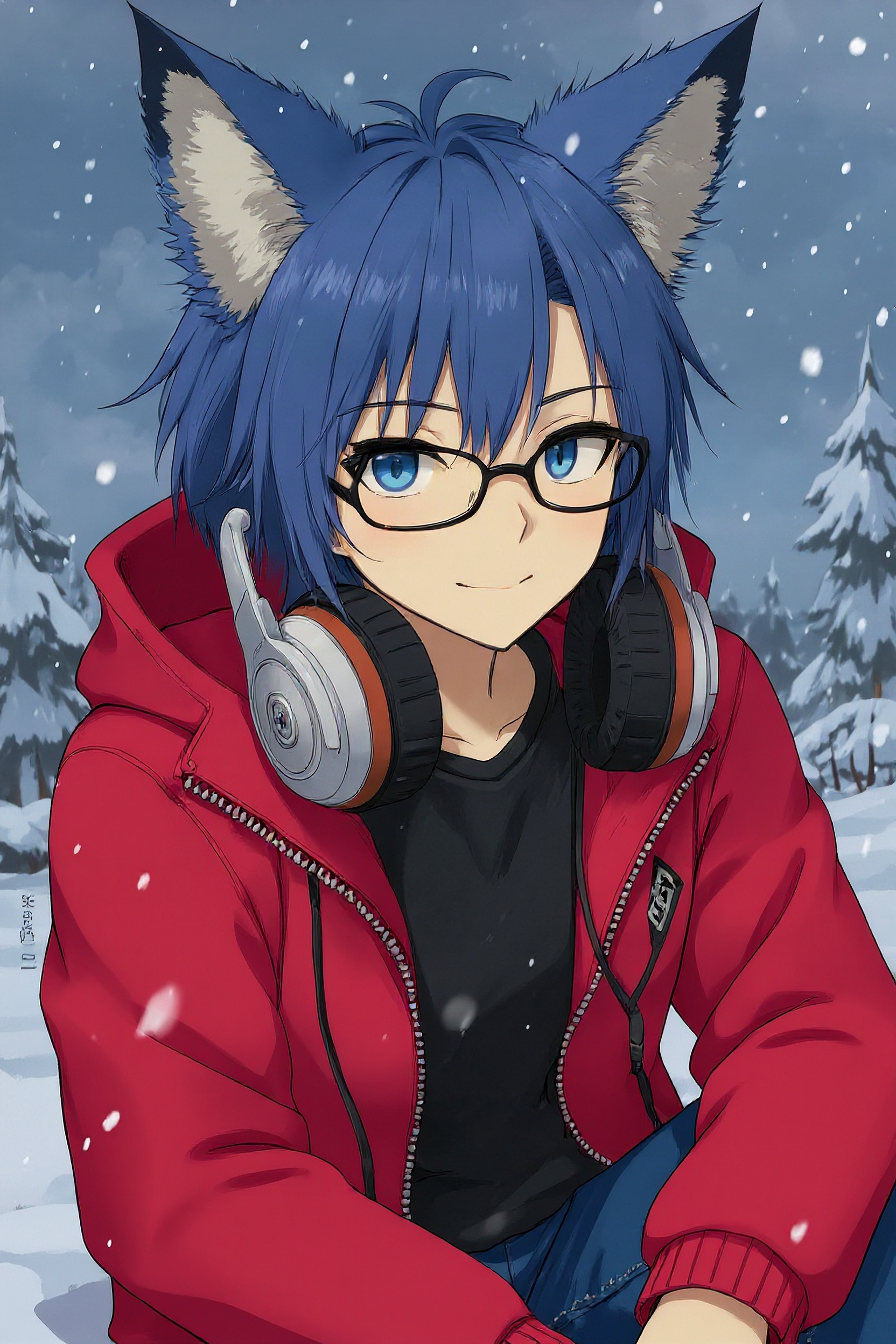
Demonstration of Flux.1 Kontext Pro ability to modify an existing image
- Left: Original image created with AnimagineXL 4.0 (a text-to-image model based on Stable Diffusion XL) and post-processed with Krita
- Right: Modified image created with Flux.1 Kontext Pro. Changes made: Addition of fox ears (kemonomimi), the position of the left arm, the colors of hair, eyes, headphone, jacket, shirt, pants, and the background

Flux is a series of text-to-image models. The models are based on rectified flow transformer blocks scaled to 12 billion parameters. Flux.1 models were released under different licences with Schnell (meaning Fast or Quick in German language) released as open-source software under Apache License, Dev released as source-available software under a non-commercial licence (users can obtain a self-serving commercial licence for Dev from BFL), and Pro released as proprietary software and only available as API that can be licensed by third-party users. Users retained the ownership of resulting output regardless of models used.

An improved flagship model, Flux 1.1 Pro was released on 2 October 2024. Two additional modes were added on 6 November, Ultra which can generate image at four times higher resolution and up to 4 megapixel without affecting generation speed and Raw which can generate hyper-realistic image in the style of candid photography.

Flux.1 Kontext is a series with in-context image generation and editing capabilities. It is available in Max, Pro, and Dev models. Max is the highest quality model and can be used to iteratively modify an existing image by using prompt while Pro is optimized to balance quality and speed of generation. Dev is an open-weight model released under non-commercial license, same as Flux.1 Dev.

Flux.2 models are based on latent flow matching architecture with Mistral AI's Mistral-3 model (24 billion parameters) for its vision-language model. As with Flux.1, Flux.2 models were also released under different licences with Klein released as open-source software under Apache License, Dev released as source-available software under a non-commercial licence (users can obtain a self-serving commercial licence from BFL), and both Flex and Pro released as proprietary software and only available as API.

The models can be used either online or locally by using generative AI user interfaces such as ComfyUI, Recraft Studio and Stable Diffusion WebUI Forge (a fork of Automatic1111 WebUI).

In July 2026, FLUX.3 was released, a text-to-video model, including FLUX3 x mimic, in collaboration with mimic robotics. FLUX3 x mimic is a video-action model running on robots. It has been performing "soft-body manipulation work" at Audi car production.

=== Table of models ===
Name	Release date	License	Notes	Ref.
FLUX.1 Dev	August 2024	Flux Non-commercial License		
FLUX.1 Pro	August 2024	Proprietary		
FLUX.1 Schnell	August 2024	Apache 2.0	Distilled model intended to run in few steps (schnell means "fast" in German)	
FLUX.1.1 Pro	October 2024	Proprietary		
FLUX.1 Kontext Max	May 2025	Proprietary		
FLUX.1 Kontext Pro	May 2025	Proprietary		
FLUX.1 Kontext Dev	June 2025	Flux Non-commercial License		
FLUX.1 Krea Dev	July 2025	Flux Non-commercial License	Developed in collaboration with Krea AI	
FLUX.2 Dev	November 2025	Flux Non-commercial License		
FLUX.2 Flex	November 2025	Proprietary	Specialized for typography	
FLUX.2 Pro	November 2025	Proprietary		
FLUX.2 Max	December 2025	Proprietary		
FLUX.2 Klein 4B	January 2026	Apache 2.0	Distilled model intended to run in few steps	
FLUX.2 Klein 4B Base	January 2026	Apache 2.0		
FLUX.2 Klein 9B	January 2026	Flux Non-commercial License	Distilled model intended to run in few steps	
FLUX.2 Klein 9B Base	January 2026	Flux Non-commercial License		
FLUX.3	July 2026	Proprietary	multimodal foundation model that learns from images, videos, and audio simultaneously	
FLUX.3 Klein	October 2026	Flux Kommunity License	Distilled model based on FLUX.3	

== Reception ==
According to a 2024 test performed by Ars Technica, the outputs generated by Flux.1 Dev and Flux.1 Pro were comparable with DALL-E 3 in terms of prompt fidelity, with the photorealism closely matched Midjourney 6 and generated human hands with more consistency over previous models such as Stable Diffusion XL.

After the release of the model, social media platform X was flooded with Flux-generated images. Flux has been criticised for its very realistic generated images. According to media reports, depictions ranged from an image of Donald Trump posing with guns to disturbing scenes, which triggered discussions about ethical implications of Flux models.Black Forest Labs has not provided exact details of the data used to train the model. Ars Technica suspected that Flux is based on a large, unauthorised collection of images scraped from the internet, like LAION, a controversial practice with potential legal consequences.

According to a 2025 test performed by Japanese technology news website Gigazine for Flux.1 Kontext, the model series has a good understanding of the English language and can easily transfer style of the image from photorealistic into anime-style according to prompts given by the user; however, its ability to understand Japanese is quite poor.

BFL has been praised for declining to work a second time with xAI after Musk had discontinued their cooperation.

As of August 2026, flux 2 had slipped to place 15 out of 148 text to image models evaluated by Artificial Analysis, a benchmarking company and place 23 by Arena.

== Availability ==
The Flux models can be used via the BFL website, and are also widely available through various third-party platforms for creative and professional use, including repositories on platforms like Hugging Face and Replicate.

== See also ==
- nano banana by Gemini
- qwen by Alibaba
- seedream by ByteDance

== Further readings ==
- FLUX.1 Kontext: Flow Matching for In-Context Image Generation and Editing in Latent Space (29 May 2025)
- FLUX.2: Analyzing and Enhancing the Latent Space of FLUX – Representation Comparison (25 November 2025)
