= Fine art authentication =

Fine art authentication is a process that ensures the integrity of artworks, preserves cultural heritage, and maintains trust in the art market. By combining traditional methods, scientific advancements, and emerging AI and Blockchain technologies, art authentication can offer accurate attributions and protect the artistic legacy for future generations. It consists of proving the authenticity of an artwork and its attribution to a specific artist. This process involves determining the origin, authorship, and historical significance of a piece of art. The proliferation of art forgeries and the increased skill of the forgers who are aware of what scientific analysis reveals requires a rigorous approach to fine art authentication.

== History ==
The requirement for art authentication has been a historical practice, evolving over centuries alongside the growing recognition of artists and the increasing value associated with their creations. During the Renaissance, the authentication of artworks was primarily based on the artist's style, brushstrokes, and technical mastery. Nevertheless, distinguishing between the original and the copy often proved challenging. As art markets expanded globally and new artistic movements emerged, the authentication process became more intricate.

Documentation examination involves scrutinizing the authenticity and accuracy of supporting paperwork, including certificates of authenticity, exhibition, and gallery records, as well as correspondence.

Art authentication is a complex and multifaceted process, often accompanied by challenges and controversies. Some of the key issues include:^{[11]}

Thierry Lenain asserts that a forger's goal is to mislead the public into believing that the generated work of art is something else entirely.
