= Automatic1111 =

Open source generative artificial intelligence UI

AUTOMATIC1111 Stable Diffusion Web UI
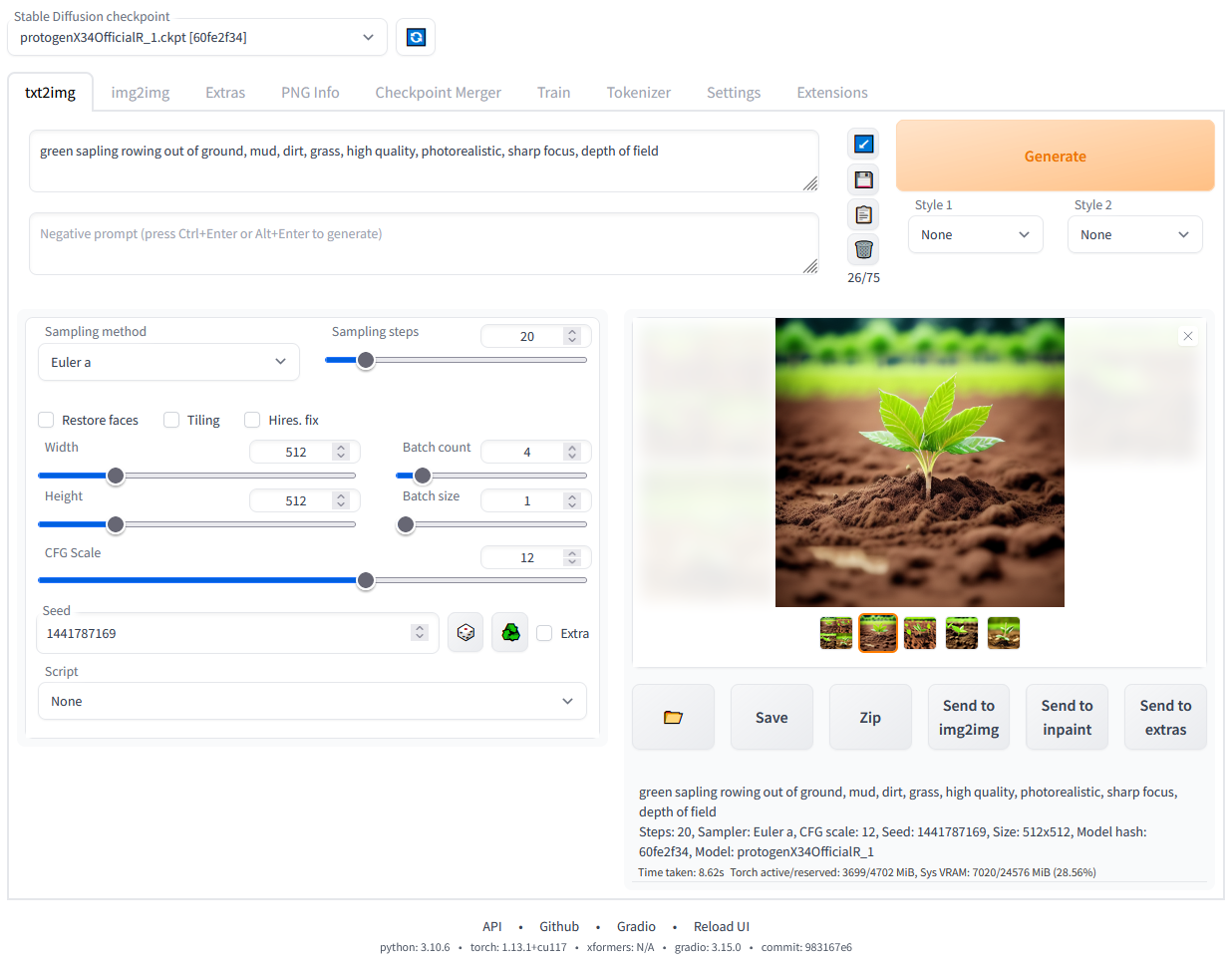
- Original author: AUTOMATIC1111
- Developers: AUTOMATIC1111 and community
- Initial release: August 22, 2022; 3 years ago
- Written in: Python
- License: AGPL-3.0
- Repository: github.com/AUTOMATIC1111/stable-diffusion-webui

AUTOMATIC1111 Stable Diffusion Web UI (SD WebUI, A1111, or Automatic1111) is an open source generative artificial intelligence program that allows users to generate images from a text prompt. It uses Stable Diffusion as the base model for its image capabilities together with a large set of extensions and features to customize its output.

== History ==
SD WebUI was released on GitHub on August 22, 2022, by AUTOMATIC1111, 1 month after the initial release of Stable Diffusion. At the time, Stable Diffusion could only be run via the command line. SD WebUI quickly rose in popularity and has been described as "the most popular tool for running diffusion models locally." SD WebUI is one of the most popular user interfaces for Stable Diffusion, together with ComfyUI. In February 2024, a book was published by ja:Gijutsu Hyoronsha on using Stable Diffusion with SD WebUI in Japanese. As of July 2024, the project had 136,000 stars on GitHub.

== Features ==
SD WebUI uses Gradio for its user interface. Each parameter in the Stable Diffusion program is exposed via a UI interface within SD WebUI. SD WebUI contains additional parameters not included in Stable Diffusion itself, such as support for Low-rank adaptations, ControlNet and custom variational autoencoders. SD WebUI supports prompt weighting, image-to-image based generation, inpainting, outpainting and image scaling. It supports over 20 samplers including DDIM, Euler, Euler a, DPM++ 2M Karras, and UniPC. It is also used for its various optimizations over the base Stable Diffusion.

== Stable Diffusion WebUI Forge ==
Stable Diffusion WebUI Forge (Forge) is a notable fork of SD WebUI started by Lvmin Zhang, who is also the creator of ControlNet and Fooocus. The initial goal of Forge was to improve the performance and features of SD WebUI with the intention to upstream changes back to SD WebUI. One of Forge's optimizations allowed users with low VRAM to generate images faster on some versions of Stable Diffusion. It improved generation speed for users with 8GB and 6GB VRAM by 30-45% and 60-75%, respectively. Forge also includes extra features such as support for more samplers than standard SD WebUI. Some of Forge's optimizations were borrowed from ComfyUI, and others were developed by the Forge team. In August 2024, Forge added support for the Flux diffusion model developed by Black Forest Labs, which is not yet supported by SD WebUI.

== See also ==
- ComfyUI
