= Sofia Crespo =

Argentine artist

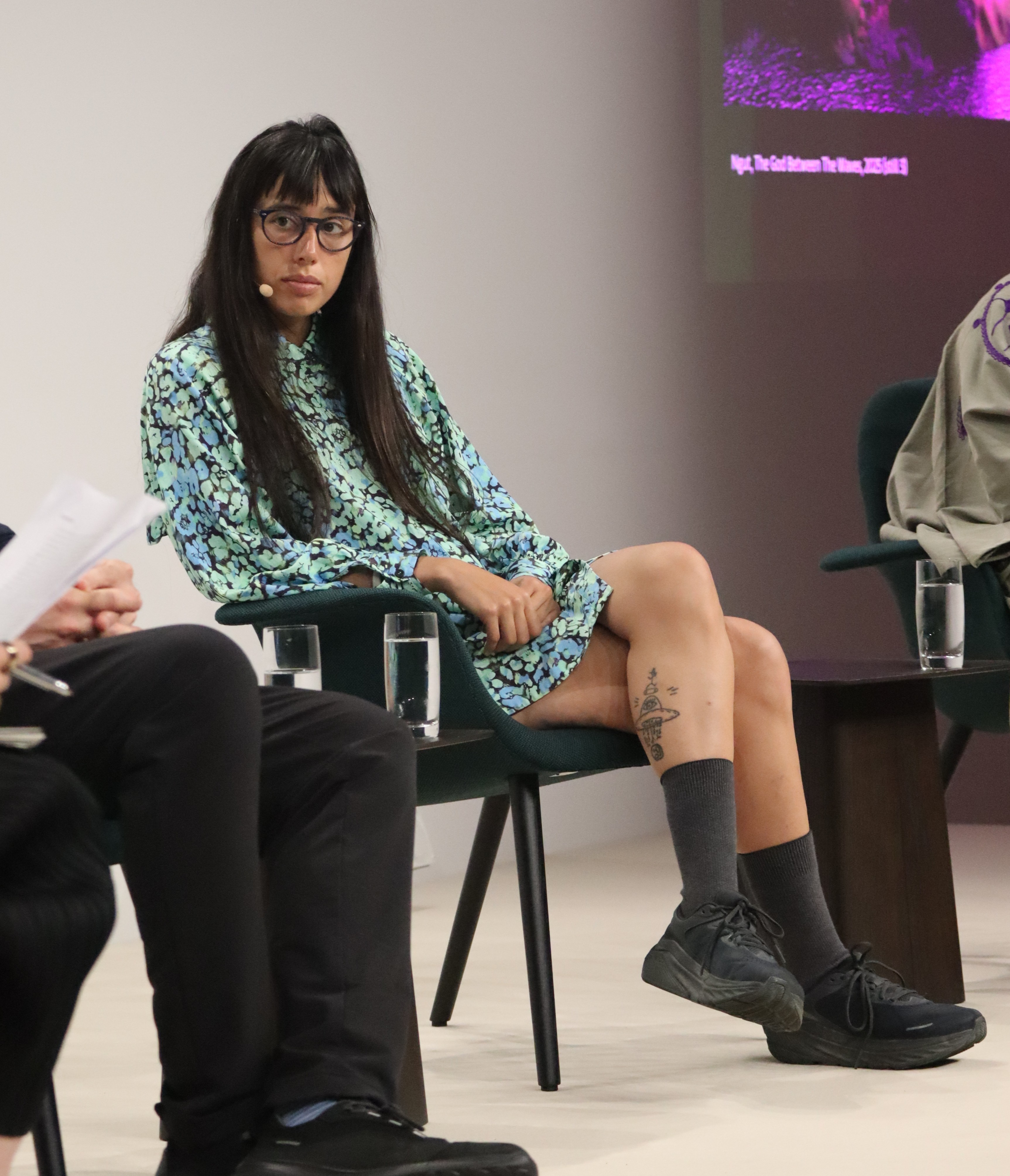
- Born: April 7, 1991 (age 35); Argentina
- Known for: Digital art; Generative art
- Notable work: Neural Zoo (2018–2020); Artificial Remnants (2020); This Jellyfish Does Not Exist (2020); Artificial Natural History (2020-2023); Beneath the Neural Waves (2021); AquA(I)formings (2021); Hybrid Ecosystems (2021); Critically Extant (2022); Structures of Being (2024)
- Website: sofiacrespo.com

Sofia Crespo (born April 7, 1991) is an Argentine visual artist who explores organic life and its evolution through artificial intelligence. She lives and works in Lisbon. As of January 2024, she is part of the artistic duo Entangled Others, alongside Norwegian artist Feileacan Kirkbride McCormick.

== Work ==
Her work explores how organic life imitates itself using AI mechanisms, challenging the notion that technology is separate from its organic origins. Crespo examines the parallels between AI image formation and human creativity, questioning the potential of AI in reshaping artistic practices. She is also deeply engaged in the evolving role of artists using machine learning techniques.

Crespo's work has been exhibited in institutions such as Kunstverein Hannover (Germany) and Fotomuseum Winterthur (Switzerland), as well as in public spaces such as Times Square.

In 2022, Buffalo AKG Art Museum added Entangled Others' Swim (2022) to their permanent collection. The same year, their work was exhibited at Falling Walls.

In 2024, Casa Batlló invited Crespo to create a mapping on the building's facade, drawing inspiration from its creative universe. The piece, titled "Structures of Being", presents nature as an evolutionary process of infinite creativity, whilst creating a parallel with Antoni Gaudí’s practice.

Crespo has also lectured for institutions, such as MIT and the Oxford Artificial Intelligence Society.

== Awards ==
In 2021, Entangled Others received the first place RE:HUMANISM award for "Beneath the Neural Waves 2.0".

The same year, Crespo was honored with the German Informatics Society's AI Newcomer Award.
