= Anna Ridler =

English contemporary artist (born 1985)

- Born: 1985 (age 40–41); London, England
- Education: Royal College of Art; Oxford University
- Known for: Digital art, machine learning, classification, dataset, systems, financial speculation, archives
- Website: annaridler.com

Anna Ridler (born 1985) is an artist who works with machine learning, handmade archives and moving image. She builds her own datasets to expose the labour and ideology embedded in the systems that organise knowledge.

Her work is held in the permanent collections of the Whitney Museum of American Art, the Victoria and Albert Museum, M+ and ZKM Center for Art and Media Karlsruhe, and has been exhibited widely at cultural institutions including Tate Modern, Barbican Centre, Centre Pompidou, The Photographers' Gallery, Taipei Fine Arts Museum, MIT Museum, Kunsthaus Graz, ZKM Center for Art and Media Karlsruhe, the Francisco Carolinum and Ars Electronica.

== Biography ==
Born in London in 1985, Ridler spent her childhood raised between Atlanta, Georgia and the United Kingdom. She obtained a Bachelor of Arts in English Literature and Language from Oxford University in 2007 and a Master of Arts in Information Experience Design from the Royal College of Art in 2017.

== Art practice ==
Ridler's practice uses technology, and in particular machine learning, to investigate how naming, classification and financial speculation determine what can be seen and what is erased. A core element of Ridler's work lies in the creation of handmade data sets through a laborious process of selecting and classifying images and text. By creating her own data sets, Ridler is able to uncover and expose underlying themes and concepts while also inverting the usual process of scraping pre-classified images found in large databases on the Internet. She began working with machine learning as an artistic material in 2017, at a moment when the technology required building every dataset by hand; that constraint became the foundation of the practice. Her interests are in drawing, machine learning, data collection, storytelling and technology.

== Work ==
Some of Ridler's most notable works to date fall within her ‘tulip series’ which explores the hysteria around tulip mania and compares it to the speculation and bubbles surrounding cryptocurrencies. The series is expressed in three forms: a photographic dataset in Myriad (Tulips), 2018; two iterations of machine generated videos in Mosaic Virus (2018) and Mosaic Virus (2019); and a website with an accompanied functioning decentralized application in Bloemenveiling (2019).

=== Myriad (Tulips) (2018) ===
I wanted to draw together ideas around capitalism, value, and the tangible and intangible nature of speculation, and collapse from two very different yet surprisingly similar moments in history.

— Anna Ridler,

Myriad (Tulips) (2018) is an installation of ten thousand hand-labeled photographs forming a dataset of unique tulips. The ten thousand, or myriad of, photographs were taken by Ridler over the course of three months, roughly the length of a tulip season, spent in Utrecht. Each photograph is carefully affixed one by one with magnets to a specially painted black wall in a laborious process to form a seemingly precise grid.

Myriad (Tulips) (2018) has been exhibited in AI: More than Human, Barbican Centre, London, UK (May 16 - August 26, 2019); Error—The Art of Imperfection, Ars Electronica Export, Berlin, Germany (November 17, 2018 – March 3, 2019); Peer to Peer, Shanghai Centre of Photography, Shanghai, China (December 8 - February 9, 2020).

The work was featured in Bloomberg, It’s Nice That, and Hyperallergic.

For Myriad (Tulips), Ridler was nominated for a Beazley Design of the Year award for her presentation of an alternative perspective on how to engage with artificial intelligence; demonstrating a departure from ownership and control of major corporations to a more personalized process of constructing and conceptualizing from the ground-up.

=== Mosaic Virus (2018, 2019) ===
Mosaic Virus (2018) is a single screen video installation displaying a grid of continually evolving tulips in bloom. For Mosaic Virus (2019) Ridler used three screens. The appearance of the tulips is controlled by artificial intelligence using fluctuations in the price of bitcoin. The stripes on the tulips' petals reflect the value of the cryptocurrency. Ridler draws parallels with the tulip mania of the 17th century; representing the hysteria and speculation around crypto-currencies. The work takes its name from the mosaic virus which caused stripes in tulip petals, subsequently increasing their desirability and leading to speculative prices.

Ridler trained a general adversarial network (GAN) on the set of ten thousand photographs of individual tulips from her work Myriad (Tulips). She used a technique called spectral normalization to improve the output.

The work was exhibited in Error—The Art of Imperfection, Ars Electronica Export, Berlin, Germany (November 17, 2018 – March 3, 2019).

=== Bloemenveiling (2019) ===
Bloemenveiling (2019) is an auction of artificial-intelligence-generated tulips on the blockchain in the form of a functioning decentralized application: http://bloemenveiling.bid. Ridler collaborated with senior research scientist at DeepMind, David Pfau to investigate whether blockchain could be used as a means of finding poetic substance within it. The piece interrogates the way technology drives human desire and economic dynamics by creating artificial scarcity.

In the work, short moving image pieces of tulips created by generative adversarial networks are sold at auction using smart contracts on the Ethereum network. Each time a tulip is sold, thousands of computers around the world all work to verify the transaction, checking each other's work against each other. While the artificial intelligence behind the moving image pieces has the potential to generate infinite flowers, the enormous distributed network is used, at great environmental cost, to introduce scarcity to an otherwise limitless resource.

Bloemenveiling was exhibited in Entangled Realities, HEK Basel, Basel, Switzerland in 2019.

== Solo exhibitions ==
- Anna Ridler, Circadian Bloom, ZKM Center for Art and Media, Karlsruhe, (2023)
- Anna Ridler, Time Blooms, Buk Seoul Museum of Art, Seoul, (2025)
- Anna Ridler, Trace Remains, Galerie Nagel Draxler, Cologne, (2026)
- Anna Ridler, Laws of Ordered Form, The Photographers' Gallery, London (2020); The Abstraction of Nature, Aksioma, Ljubljana (2020)

== Awards and recognition ==
- European Union EMAP Fellow (2018)
- DARE Art Prize (2018–2019)
- Featured in Thames & Hudson, Digital Art (1960s–Now)
- Featured in British Art: The Last 15 Years
- ABS Digital Artist of the Year (2025)
