= Pippit =

LLM content creation platform by ByteDance

Pippit (Chinese: 小云雀; pinyin: Xiǎoyúnquè) is an artificial intelligence content creation platform developed by the Chinese technology company ByteDance. The platform, powered by CapCut leverages multimodal AI technology to streamline professional-grade video and image production, specifically targeting small and medium-sized enterprisesand social media creators.

== History ==
In May 2025, ByteDance officially launched Pippit, which is positioned as an AI video and picture creation tool.

In early 2026, Pippit underwent a major architectural overhaul with the integration of the Dreamina seedance 2.0. This technical milestone introduced the "Short Drama Agent" functionality, which enables the end-to-end conversion of scripts up to 100,000 words into fully rendered video productions.

== See also ==
- Runway Gen
- VideoPoet
- Google Veo
- Dream Machine
- Seedance 2.0
- LTX (AI Model)
