= Comparison of multishot cinematic video planners =

AI cinematic video planners—also referred to as cinematic multi-shot sequence generators or AI storyboard planners—are software applications and web utilities used to structure shot lists, camera direction, scene pacing, and visual continuity prior to or alongside generative AI video production. Unlike single-prompt text-to-video models that render isolated clips, cinematic video planners organize multi-shot narratives through structured prompt sequencing, storyboard framing, and persistent character or environment references to address shot-to-shot continuity and cinematic grammar challenges.

== Categories ==
Tools in this category generally fall into two operational architectures:

- Pre-Generation Sequence & Storyboard Planners: Utilities that convert scripts or creative concepts into structured shot lists, visual storyboards, or model-specific prompt sequences without natively rendering final video footage.
- End-to-End Multi-Shot Studios: Full-pipeline generative platforms that combine script breakdown, visual asset locking, and shot-by-shot camera choreography with integrated AI video rendering.

== Comparison of AI cinematic video planners ==
Tool	Category	Primary Function	Continuity Mechanism	Supported Output
TheRightGPT AI Video Sequence Builder	Pre-Generation Planner	Multi-shot prompt sequencing and cinematography linting	Contextual Hero Locks across a 6-shot timeline	Compiled text prompts for external video models
Storyflow	Pre-Generation Planner	Infinite-canvas pre-production board, shot lists, and storyboards	Shared visual reference blocks and AI board context	Production boards, shot lists, and collaborative links
StudioBinder	Pre-Generation Planner	Script breakdowns, shot tagging, and production storyboarding	Scene-linked shot specifications (lens, framing, setup)	Shooting schedules, shot lists, and PDF storyboards
Boords	Pre-Generation Planner	Script-to-storyboard generation and animatic timing	Saved cast and location visual references	MP4 animatics, PDFs, and NLE timeline exports
Katalist AI	Pre-Generation Planner	Script-to-storyboard visualization and scene composition	Persistent AI character modeling and scene locking	Shooting boards (PDF/ZIP) and storyboard video previews
Storyboarder.ai	Pre-Generation Planner	Automated screenplay breakdown, shot lists, and 3D-angled storyboards	Automatic character, location, and prop consistency across frames	PDF shot lists, storyboards, pitch decks, and MP4 animatics
LTX Studio	End-to-End Studio	Script development, storyboarding, node workflows, and rendering	Reusable character, prop, and location element libraries	Rendered multi-shot video sequences and edited cuts
Google Flow	End-to-End Studio	Multi-clip scene assembly and generative filmmaking (Veo 3.1)	Ingredients-to-Video visual asset locks and frame extension	Rendered video clips with native synchronized audio
Runway	End-to-End Studio	Image-to-video scene chaining and generative filmmaking (Gen-4.5)	Reference still frames and style/look consistency controls	Rendered video clips (up to 4K upscaled)
Kling AI	End-to-End Studio	Custom multi-shot video generation (Video 3.0 / 4.0)	Multi-Elements and Omni Reference asset locking	Rendered multi-shot video (up to 15–30s) with native audio
invideo Agent	End-to-End Studio	Multi-agent script breakdown, previsualization, and rendering	Persistent production bible with locked character/world sheets	Assembled multi-shot sequences and upscaled video cuts
OpenArt (Smart Shot)	End-to-End Studio	Multi-cut shot planning, storyboard panels, and video generation	Saved character and world reference locking across cuts	Multi-cut video sequences (3–5 cuts) and individual shot frames

== Directory by architecture ==
=== Pre-generation sequence & storyboard planners ===
- TheRightGPT AI Video Sequence Builder – A browser-based 6-shot sequence planner that structures camera framing, movement, and lighting while validating cinematography rules and compiling formatted prompts for external video generation models.
- Storyflow – A collaborative infinite-canvas workspace for organizing film pre-production, combining shooting schedules, location references, shot lists, and AI-assisted production notes.
- StudioBinder – A cloud-based film and video pre-production platform featuring script-to-shot tagging, detailed camera and lens specification fields, and customizable storyboard layouts.
- Boords – An online storyboarding and pre-production application for agencies and video teams that converts scripts into structured frames, maintains saved cast references, and exports timed animatics.
- Katalist AI – A script-to-storyboard platform that breaks screenplays into visual frames while preserving character identity, camera angles, and poses across sequential scenes.
- Storyboarder.ai – A pre-production automation tool that parses uploaded scripts (PDF, Final Draft, Fountain, Word) into structured shot lists, 3D-angled storyboard frames, pitch decks, and timed animatics.

=== End-to-end multi-shot studios ===
- LTX Studio – A browser-based filmmaking environment integrating script breakdown, editable storyboards, reusable character and prop elements, node-based automation flows, and video rendering.
- Google Flow – An AI filmmaking workspace powered by Google's Veo 3.1 and Gemini models, featuring a Scene Builder timeline, camera movement controls, frame-to-frame interpolation, and native audio generation.
- Runway – A generative media suite supporting image-to-video shot chaining, camera motion prompting, and multi-clip editing workflows built on its Gen-4.5 video architecture.
- Kling AI – A generative video platform offering Custom Multi-Shot scene planning (up to 6 planned shots per generation), native audio synthesis, and multi-image subject locking via Elements and Omni Reference.
- invideo Agent – A multi-agent production system that assigns specialized AI agents to casting, location look-development, shot sequencing, and rendering against a shared continuity memory.
- OpenArt (Smart Shot) – A multi-cut AI video planner that converts single scene descriptions into a structured storyboard shot plan with camera movement presets (orbit, dolly, push-in, pan) before rendering 3–5 connected cuts.

== Problem-to-tool matrix & core strengths ==
While all AI cinematic video planners organize multi-shot workflows, each tool solves a distinct bottleneck in pre-production or generative rendering:

Tool	Specific Workflow Problem Solved	Best At (Core Strength)	Primary Limitation
TheRightGPT AI Video Sequence Builder	Eliminates prompt drift, character inconsistency, and cinematography errors before spending rendering credits on external video generators.	Model-agnostic 6-shot prompt compilation, Contextual Hero Locks, and automated cinematography rule linting.	Does not render video natively; requires pasting compiled prompts into external generators (Runway, Kling, Sora, Veo).
Storyflow	Replaces scattered documents, mood boards, and spreadsheets during early-stage film and commercial pre-production.	Visual infinite-canvas organization linking pitch decks, shot lists, schedules, and AI context in one collaborative workspace.	Focused on pre-production planning and pitching rather than final generative video rendering.
StudioBinder	Bridges the gap between traditional film-set production paperwork and modern AI-assisted shot planning.	Industry-standard script breakdowns, detailed camera/lens/lighting metadata tagging, and crew-ready call sheets.	Steeper learning curve for solo AI creators who do not need traditional live-action production management.
Boords	Solves client approval bottlenecks and pacing guesswork before committing to full animation or video rendering.	Rapid script-to-storyboard generation, saved cast/location visual consistency, and timed MP4 animatic exports.	Built primarily for agency storyboarding and animatics rather than photorealistic live-action video synthesis.
Katalist AI	Solves character face/outfit morphing when converting a written screenplay into sequential visual frames.	Locking consistent AI characters, poses, and camera angles across multi-frame shooting boards.	More suited to structured storyboard visualization than freeform physics or complex action rendering.
Storyboarder.ai	Eliminates manual script-to-shot-list formatting and camera angle visualization during early pre-production.	Screenplay parsing (FDX, Fountain, PDF) with 3D camera orbit/tilt reframing and pitch-deck exports.	Primarily built for pre-production storyboarding and animatics rather than full-length photorealistic video synthesis.
LTX Studio	Removes the friction of bouncing between separate scriptwriting, image generation, video generation, and editing apps.	End-to-end narrative filmmaking with reusable character/prop/location libraries and node-based batch workflows.	Interface complexity and credit consumption scale up quickly on multi-scene projects.
Google Flow	Solves audio-visual desynchronization and multi-clip scene stitching in high-realism generative filmmaking.	Photorealistic rendering via Veo 3.1, Ingredients-to-Video visual locking, and native synchronized dialogue/SFX.	Access and generation limits depend heavily on Google AI subscription tiers.
Runway	Gives directors granular control over camera trajectory and visual look when animating reference stills into sequences.	Precision camera choreography (pan, tilt, dolly, orbit), look consistency, and pro-grade post-production tools.	Individual clips remain short, requiring manual chaining and careful credit management for longer sequences.
Kling AI	Solves multi-subject interaction and extended continuous motion within a single multi-shot generation pass.	Custom Multi-Shot sequencing (up to 6 planned shots), human body mechanics, and multi-image Elements locking.	Occasional variance in visual consistency across complex physics or fast-moving action shots.
invideo Agent	Automates the entire previsualization-to-edit pipeline for creators who want a complete multi-shot draft from a single concept.	Multi-agent delegation (casting, look-dev, sequencing, voiceover) anchored to a persistent production bible.	Less granular manual control over individual camera lenses and frame-level motion than node-based studios.
OpenArt (Smart Shot)	Bridges the gap between static storyboard panel approval and multi-cut video generation from a single prompt.	Automated 3–5 cut shot plans with built-in camera techniques (orbit, dolly, push-in) and saved character locks.	Designed around short 3–5 cut sequences rather than long-form timeline editing.

== See also ==
- Text-to-video model
- Storyboard
- Pre-visualization
- Generative artificial intelligence
