= Aespa videography =

Aespa video discography
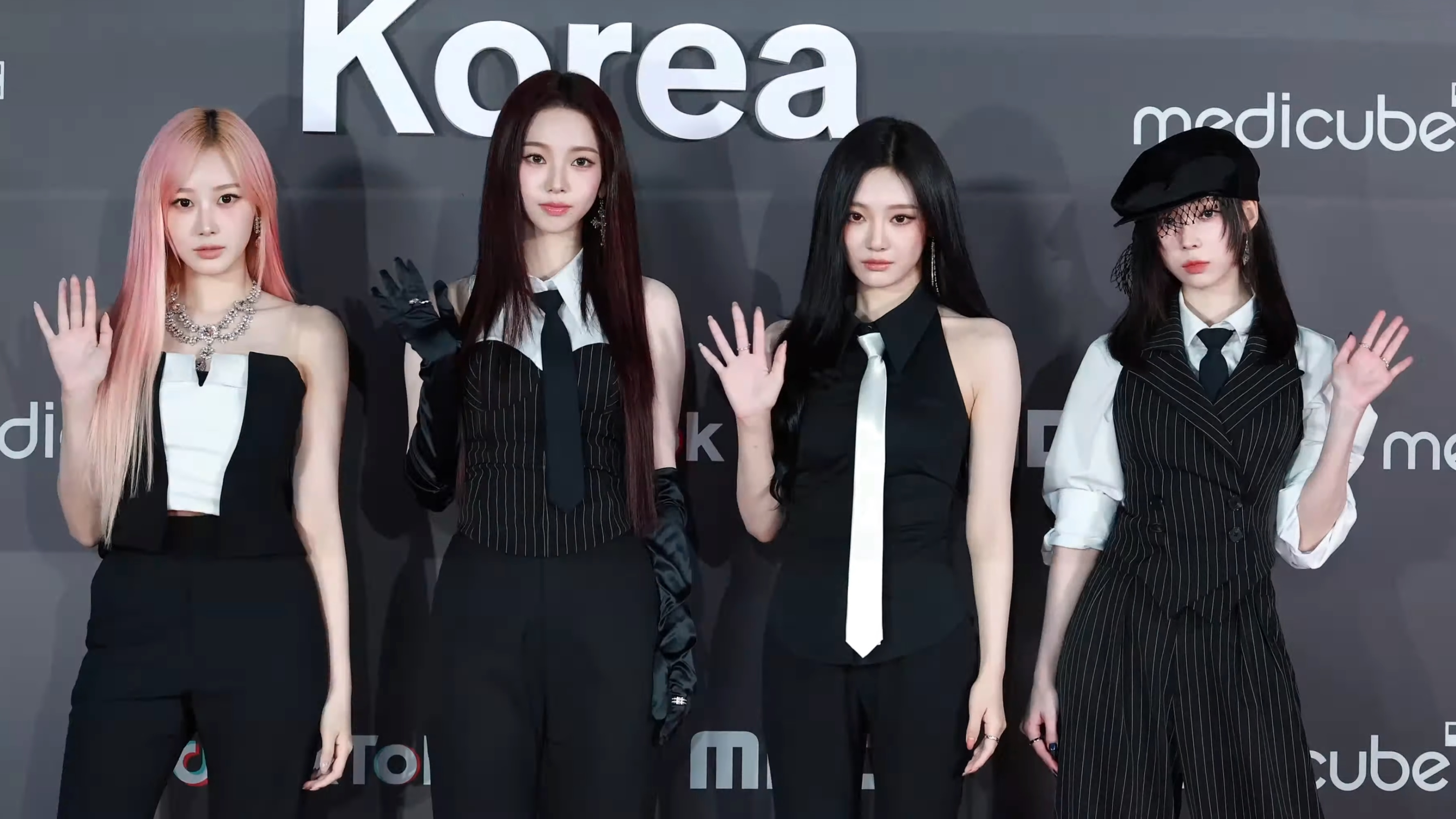
- Aespa in November 2024
- Video albums: 5
- Music videos: 37
- Films: 2

South Korean girl group Aespa made their debut in November 2020 and have since released or been featured in thirty-seven music videos, along with five video albums.

== Music videos ==
=== 2020s ===
Song title	Year	Director(s)	Ref.
"Black Mamba"	2020	Oui Kim (Bright Young Things)	
"Forever" (약속)	2021	Yoo Sung-kyun (Sunny Visual)	
"Next Level"	2021	Jo Beom-jin (Paranoid Paradigm)	
"Next Level" (Habstrakt Remix)	2021	Unknown	
"Savage"	2021	725 (SL8 Visual Lab)	
"Dreams Come True"	2021	Seo Dong-hyeok, Jason Kim (Flipevil)	
"Life's Too Short" (English Version)	2022	Kim Hyun-soo (Segaji Video)	
"Girls"	2022	Oui Kim	
"Girls" (Brllnt Remix)	2022	Unknown	
"Beautiful Christmas" (with Red Velvet)	2022	Unknown	
"Welcome to My World"	2023	Bang Jae-yeob	
"Spicy"	2023	725 (SL8 Visual Lab)	
"Better Things"	2023	Jan' Qui	
"Spicy" (Nitepunk Remix)	2023	Megg Studio	
"Better Things" (æ-aespa Version)	2023	Lee Jung-su, Jung Je-yoon	
"Drama"	2023	Samson (Highqualityfish)	
"Regret of the Times"	2024	Eehosoo (680House)	
"Get Goin''" (with Fraggle Rock)	2024	Unknown	
"Supernova"	2024	Ha Jung-hoon (Hattrick)	
"Armageddon"	2024	Rima Yoon, DJ Jang (Rigend Film)	
"Live My Life"	2024	Lee Ho-jae, Lee Jae-hyun (Studio Surplus)	
"Hot Mess"	2024	Lafic	
"Supernova" (Grimes Remix)	2024	Unknown	
"Armageddon" (Flava D Remix)	2024	Unknown	
"Supernova" (Grimes Remix) (The Other World version)	2024	Baki (Aplan Company)	
"Whiplash"	2024	Meltmirror (Segaji Video)	
"Dirty Work"	2025	Oui Kim	
"Dark Arts"	2025	Unknown	
"Rich Man"	2025	Rima Yoon (Rigend Film)	
"Rich Man" (Yellow Claw Remix)	2025	None (made with Flow)	
"WDA (Whole Different Animal)" (featuring G-Dragon)	2026	Taejong Song	
"Lemonade"	2026	Bang Jae-yeob	
"Lemonade" (Zedd Remix)	2026	Unknown	
"Lemonade" (Marlon Hoffstadt Remix)	2026	Unknown	
"Lemonade" (2Spade Remix)	2026	Unknown	
"Kiss n Tell"	2026	Luke Casey	
"Switchblade" (featuring Ty Dolla Sign)	2026	Taejong Song, Ko Un Min	

=== Other videos ===
Title	Year	Director(s)	Ref.
"My, Karina"	2020	hamjae [88 GH]	
"Synk, æspa"	2020	051/Heung	
"Synk, Winter"	2020	051/Heung	
"Synk, Giselle"	2020	051/Heung	
"Synk, Ningning"	2020	051/Heung	
"Synk, Karina"	2020	051/Heung	
"'Black Mamba' The Debut Stage"	2020	Lim Sung-kwan	
"'Forever' (약속) The Performance Stage (Cozy Winter Cabin Ver.)"	2021	Unknown	
"'Forever' (약속) The Performance Stage (Glitter Snowball Ver.)"	2021	Unknown	
"'Forever' (약속) The Performance Stage (Romantic Street Ver.)"	2021	Unknown	
"ep1. 'Black Mamba' – SM Culture Universe"	2021	Son Tae-heung and Min Heo	
"'Next Level' The Performance Stage #1"	2021	Unknown	
"'Next Level' The Performance Stage #2"	2021	Unknown	
"'Next Level' The Performance Stage #3"	2021	Unknown	
"'Savage' The Performance Stage #1"	2021	Unknown	
"'Savage' The Performance Stage #2"	2021	Unknown	
"ep2. 'Next Level' – SM Culture Universe"	2022	Son Tae-heung	
"'Girls' The Performance Stage #1"	2022	SM Town Dreammaker	
"'Girls' The Performance Stage #2"	2022	SM Town Dreammaker	
"ep.3 'Girls (Don't you know I'm a Savage?)' – SM Culture Universe"	2023	Son Tae-heung	
"'My World' Intro"	2023	Lee Joon-mo	
"'I'm Unhappy' Track Video"	2023	Byul Yun	
"'Salty & Sweet' Track Video"	2023	Lafic	
"'Thirsty' Track Video"	2023	Jinooya Makes	
"'Til We Meet Again' Special Video"	2023	Unknown	
"'Better Things' Performance Video"	2023	Unknown	
"'Better Things' The Performance Stage"	2023	Hong Soo-min	
"'Drama' Intro"	2023	Park Soo-bin	
"'Drama' The Scene | Mood Sampler"	2023	Park Soo-bin	
"I'm the Drama #Giselle"	2023	Park Hyeong-jun	
"I'm the Drama #Winter"	2023	Park Hyeong-jun	
"I'm the Drama #Ningning"	2023	Park Hyeong-jun	
"I'm the Drama #Karina"	2023	Park Hyeong-jun	
"'Drama' Performance Video"	2023	Unknown	
"'Armageddon' Intro"	2024	Jo Woo-cheol	
"'Armageddon' Launch Code"	2024	2eehyein	
"'Armageddon' Superbeing #Winter"	2024	Jo Woo-cheol	
"'Armageddon' Superbeing #Giselle"	2024	Jo Woo-cheol	
"'Armageddon' Superbeing #Ningning"	2024	Jo Woo-cheol	
"'Armageddon' Superbeing #Karina"	2024	Jo Woo-cheol	
"'Long Chat (#♥)' Universe"	2024	Vin Kim	
"'Licorice' Universe"	2024	Park Cheol-ho	
"'Live My Life' Universe"	2024	Lee Ho-jae and Lee Jae-hyun	
"'Armageddon' Find The Authentic"	2024	Park Cheol-ho	
"'Armageddon' Find The Authentic #Karina"	2024	Park Cheol-ho	
"'Armageddon' Find The Authentic #Giselle"	2024	Park Cheol-ho	
"'Armageddon' Find The Authentic #Winter"	2024	Park Cheol-ho	
"'Armageddon' Find The Authentic #Ningning"	2024	Park Cheol-ho	
"'Whiplash' Intro"	2024	Unknown	
"'Whiplash' Unbeatable Beat #Winter"	2024	Halex	
"'Whiplash' Unbeatable Beat #Giselle"	2024	Halex	
"'Whiplash' Unbeatable Beat #Karina"	2024	Halex	
"'Whiplash' Unbeatable Beat #Ningning"	2024	Halex	
"'Whiplash' Unstoppable Speed"	2024	Unknown	
"'Dirty Work' Intro"	2025	Unknown	
"'Dirty Work' Performance Video"	2025	Liminal	
"Do Dirty Work Clip #Ningning"	2025	Unknown	
"Do Dirty Work Clip #Karina"	2025	Unknown	
"Do Dirty Work Clip #Giselle"	2025	Unknown	
"Do Dirty Work Clip #Winter"	2025	Unknown	
"'Dirty Work' Dirty Worker #Ningning"	2025	Unknown	
"'Dirty Work' Dirty Worker #Winter"	2025	Unknown	
"'Dirty Work' Dirty Worker #Giselle"	2025	Unknown	
"'Dirty Work' Dirty Worker #Karina"	2025	Unknown	
"'Dirty Work' Choreography Video"	2025	Lee Han-gyeol	
"'Rich Man' Intro"	2025	Unknown	
"'Rich Man' Trailer | I am a Rich Man"	2025	Lee Ok-seop	
"'Rich Man' Highlight Medley"	2025	Gohgow	
"'Rich Man' Brust Film"	2025	Han Dae-hee	

== Albums ==
=== Live video albums ===
Title	Album details	Peak chart positions	
Title	Album details	JPN DVD	JPN BD
Aespa Live Tour 2023 "Synk: Hyper Line" in Japan -Special Edition-	Released: December 27, 2023; Label: Warner Music Japan; Formats: DVD, Blu-ray	5	3
Aespa Æpisode Synk #1	Released: February 7, 2025 (DVD and digital code card); February 28, 2025 (Blu-ray); Label: SM Entertainment; Formats: DVD, digital code card, Blu-ray	—	—
2024 Aespa Live Tour "Synk: Parallel Line" in Tokyo Dome -Special Edition-	Released: March 26, 2025; Label: Warner Music Japan; Formats: Blu-ray	—	5
Aespa: World Tour in Cinemas	Released: June 11, 2025; Label: Avex Pictures; Formats: DVD, Blu-ray	20	8
"—" denotes a recording that did not chart or was not released in that territory.

=== Other video albums ===
Title	Album details	Peak chart positions
Title	Album details	JPN DVD
Aespa's Synk Road	Released: June 19, 2024; Label: Warner Music Japan; Formats: DVD	9

== Filmography ==
=== Films ===
Title	Year	Role	Ref.
Aespa: MY First Page	2024	Themselves	
Aespa: World Tour in Cinemas	2024	Themselves	

=== Television ===
Title	Year	Role	Notes	Ref.
Fraggle Rock: Back to the Rock	2024	Themselves	Guest; Episode: "Hope and Socks"	

=== Web shows ===
Title	Year	Platform	Ref.
Aespa's Synk Road	2022	Wavve	
Better Things	2023	YouTube	
Who Visit the Villa?	2023	YouTube	
Aesparty	2024	YouTube	
Dirty Workshop	2025	YouTube	
School of Rich	2025	YouTube	

== See also ==
- Aespa discography
