= Arknights: Endfield =

2026 video game

- Developers: Hypergryph; Mountain Contour
- Publishers: CHN: Hypergryph; TWN/HKG/MAC: Ariel; WW: Gryphline; Vietnam: Hồng Hà JSC
- Series: Arknights
- Engine: Unity
- Platforms: Android; iOS; PlayStation 5; Windows
- Release: 22 January 2026
- Genre: Action-adventure
- Modes: Single-player, multiplayer

Arknights: Endfield
- Traditional Chinese: 明日方舟：終末地
- Simplified Chinese: 明日方舟：终末地
- Literal meaning: Ark of Tomorrow: Land of the End
Transcriptions
Standard Mandarin
- Hanyu Pinyin: Míngrì Fāngzhōu: Zhōngmòdì

Arknights: Endfield (Note: Chinese: 明日方舟：终末地; pinyin: Míngrì Fāngzhōu: Zhōngmòdì; lit. 'Ark of Tomorrow: Land of the End') is an action role-playing game developed and published by Hypergryph. A spin-off of Arknights (2019), the game was released on 22 January 2026, for Android, iOS, PlayStation 5 and Windows.

== Gameplay ==
Arknights: Endfield is a real-time 3D action role-playing game with strategic elements. Unlike the original Arknights, which features tower defense mechanics, Endfield introduces a semi-open world experience with base-building and strategic management elements.

A screenshot of combat

The core mechanism of combat is the combo skill system. Players control a four-member team simultaneously, with the ability to switch between characters during battle, each of which has unique skills and abilities. Combat operates through a semi-real-time system where players can switch control between different characters, utilizing skill combinations and tactical coordination to defeat enemies. The system includes multiple attack types: basic attacks, tactical skills, combo skills, and ultimate abilities. Basic attacks are further divided into normal attack, drop attack, final attack (of a sequence), and execution/finisher moves.

The four-member team shares three skill gauges, and any operator can consume one to use a tactical skill. The skill gauges recharge over time, and operators not under direct control perform only basic attacks. Heavy hits from basic attacks can directly add segments to the skill gauge and increase enemy imbalance values. When an enemy's imbalance gauge fills completely, they enter an imbalanced state, taking increased damage and the next heavy attack becomes an execution attack. This imbalanced state lasts temporarily before disappearing, requiring players to re-accumulate imbalance through strategic combat.

Endfield features a base-building system that combines exploration with resource management and aspects of a factory simulation, similar to those found in games like Factorio or Satisfactory. Players harvest resources from remote mining nodes connected by custom ziplines, refine and process materials at specific machines, and route them through conveyor belts for crafting. The system requires budgeting and routing electricity, assigning inputs and outputs, and managing various ore types. Developers have stated they aim for an 50:50 ratio between RPG elements and factory building portions, but players may customize their gameplay balance according to their personal preferences.The base builder supplies progression items quickly, encouraging players to learn and develop their industrial complexes.

Like Arknights, Endfield has a variety of game modes with unique mechanics, with "Etchspace Salvage", an extraction-type game mode; "Umbral Monument", an trial game mode with multiple stages, and "Delver of the Cryptic", an puzzle-type mode, are added in launch. A fourth game mode, "Echoes of War", was added in July 2026. Aside from permanent game modes, Endfield also features several limited time modes, including "Contingency Contract", the recurring game mode from Arknights, made its debut in June 2026.

== Plot ==
Arknights: Endfield takes place on a moon called "Talos-II", and the player takes upon the role of the "Endministrator" of the titular "Endfield Industries" corporation.

The moon Talos-II was colonized 152 years prior to the beginning of the game's story by pioneers from Terra, the planet that serves as the setting of the previous game, accessing it through a dimensional portal known as an "Cosmic Gate." The portal was destroyed five years after the colonization of the moon during the Aggeloi War, leaving the Terran pioneers stranded on Talos-II and eventually building their own civilizations. Several concepts, factions and characters from Arknights appear, such as Originium, an energy-rich mineral enabling the use of special pseudo-magical abilities called "Arts", and "Rhodes Island", the pharmaceutical corporation which the player character belonged to in Arknights.

Similarly to Terra, Talos-II is a world of natural disasters known as "Catastrophes", most notably a dangerous supernatural disaster called "Corruption", which causes distorted environments and abnormal physical phenomena in the affected areas. Much of Talos-II is wilderness and no-man's land. An endemic species of creatures called "Aggeloi" act as the primary threat to civilization; while armed raiders known as "Landbreakers" live in the fringes of society making a living off scavenging and crime. The pioneers belong to different nations and organizations, cooperating and competing with each other on a regular basis.

With the resumption of the exploration of the ruins by the major powers of Talos-II, the Protocol Recycling Department was rebuilt under the leadership of Endfield Industries' Superintendent Perlica. The Endfield Engineering Center has integrated a large number of prototype equipment from the Protocol Recycling Department and successfully developed the "Automated Industry Complex". In order to prove the reliability of the system's transmission technology, the Protocol Recycling Department chose "Valley No. 4", the most barren area of Talos-II, as its target, attempting to use it as the basis for its gradual exploration outwards.

== Development and release ==
Arknights: Endfield was developed by Hypergryph, which had released its predecessor, Arknights. Endfield uses the Unity engine.

In 2022, Hypergryph opened user accounts for Arknights: Endfield and released a pilot trailer. A first technical test of the game on PC by prospective players took place in January 2024. Another limited beta test took place in January 2025. Endfield's released date was officially revealed at The Game Awards 2025 and was released on 22 January 2026.

On the day of its launch, Arknights: Endfield players who connected their PayPal accounts reported that their accounts were making payments of various amounts in different currencies, presumably microtransactions made by other players. In response, Hypergryph disabled the PayPal functionality and refunded all purchases.

== Marketing ==
On 10 March 2022, Hypergryph opened official accounts for Arknights: Endfield on various social media platforms. On 16 March, a teaser trailer PV was released, and a multilingual official website was announced. Players could pre-register for the game on the official website. The image on the back of the website showed a countdown of 48:00:00, indicating that the official game PV would be released in two days. On 18 March, a new concept CG and an initial gameplay demonstration video were released. The CG provided voice acting in Chinese, English, Japanese and Korean, and it was announced that Arknights: Endfield would be a real-time strategy role-playing game.

A year and a half later, on 25 October 2023, the official game account released a promotional image hinting at new information to be released, and the next day released a "Technical Test" PV, announcing that the technical test would begin in mainland China on 10 November 2023. On 8 December 2023, the PV was released at the 2023 Game Awards, announcing that the game would be launched on the PS5 platform, and that the technical test would begin globally on 12 January 2024. In August 2024, the game obtained a publication license from the State Press and Publication Administration.

On 14 December 2024, the official game released a PV for the "Second Test", announcing that the second test would be launched in mid-January 2025. The test was conducted from 17 January to 17 February 2025. Subsequently, on 28 April 2025, the official announced the launch of player recruitment for the "Second Test" of the mobile version of Arknights: Endfield. The test was a confidential test, and the recruitment event lasted until 23:59 on 11 May 2025.

In September 2025, Apple showcased the gameplay of the mobile version of Arknights: Endfield at its iPhone 17 Pro launch event and revealed in a press release after the event that the game would be launched in early 2026. On 31 October of the same year, the game publisher Griffin Frontier and the developer Hengxing Mountain Studio announced the launch of the "Beta Test II" player recruitment event for the game, and stated that the test would be launched on 28 November of the same year on PC, iOS and Android platforms.

On 12 December 2025, Hypergryph officially announced that the game would launch its global open beta on 22 January 2026, confirming the expected release date previously revealed by Apple, and it was launched on PS5, PC, iOS, Android and other platforms on the same day.

On 16 January 2026, Hypergryph held a preview live stream of Arknights: Endfield and broadcast it on multiple platforms simultaneously, officially confirming that the game will be launched globally on all platforms on 22 January, and also released the launch PV.

== Reception ==
Reception

Aggregate scores
Aggregator	Score
Metacritic	PC: 78/100
OpenCritic	88% recommend

Review scores
Publication	Score
Hardcore Gamer	4/5
IGN	7/10
Pocket Gamer	3.5/5
Push Square	8/10
GamingBolt	7/10
TheGamer	3/5
CGMagazine	9/10
Gamersky	8.7/10

According to review aggregator Metacritic, Arknights: Endfield received "mostly positive" reception, with an aggregate score of 78/100 based on 21 critic reviews; in 14 reviews compiled by review aggregator OpenCritic, the positive reviews account for 88%. GamingBolt reviewer Ravi Sinha gave the game an overall rating of "good". TheGamer reviewer Harry Alston believed that although the game has excellent visuals and character design, its delivery is ultimately "more style over substance". IGN commentator Sarah Thwaites said that there is more to explore in the game besides the "login loop", and that after about 20 hours of play, she would still be willing to continue exploring the character motivations, upgrades and "more rewarding depth". Polygon commentator Paulo Kawanishi believed that while the science fiction theme and base building bring a sense of novelty, it is not enough to make it stand out in the crowded gacha game market.

Reviews generally praised the visual and musical presentation of the game. Sinha praised its visual presentation and art style, the creation of sci-fi industrial scenes and the quality of music, and pointed out that although its semi-open areas are not a true open world, the content density is high and the exploration elements and side activities are plentiful. Thwaites also mentioned that its cyberpunk visual background and atmosphere can immerse the player, and said that the battle performance after the later development is “visually attractive”. Kawanishi also highlighted the character models and smooth action combat to create an attractive sci-fi world view. CGMagazine’s Jordan Bioludi also affirmed the visual and musical presentation, believing that the overall content and system depth of the game exceeded his expectations for a gacha game. Alston affirmed the attractiveness of the character design, world view and scene and audiovisual presentation, but believed that its external texture failed to translate into enough gameplay and narrative support.

In terms of gameplay structure and exploration, Sinha believed that the design of combining action role-playing, exploration and factory building/automation system is quite unique, and the factory building system is closely linked to the main gameplay, and the tutorial reduces the threshold for getting started. Thwaites pointed out that the game process mainly revolves around resource collection, simple environmental platform puzzles and area clearing, and unlocks base building and automation in the meta system; she believes that the content of puzzle-solving and area advancement is "not particularly imaginative", but it is still easy for players to be immersed for a long time under the vivid visual atmosphere. Bioludi praised the "Factorio-like" factory building/automation and the "environmental engineering" design in exploration as being interconnected, and pointed out that these mechanisms make exploration and building form a tighter cycle, citing zip lines, energy relays and puzzle devices as examples; he also mentioned that the game adds asynchronous shared construction similar to Death Stranding, making the world more connected. On the other hand, Kawanishi argued that while the base building and production system exists and appears complex, it is not "critical" enough in the narrative and main storyline progression. Many of its mechanisms are more like variations of similar game systems: for example, mining devices are similar to quick gathering/dispatch missions, ziplines become less important after fast travel is unlocked, and building elements such as power towers are often more like "pieces of the puzzle to advance the campaign". Alston also criticized the factory/automation system, although it appears complex, but in reality it is "complex but not deep," involving a large amount of repetitive data collection. The refining process turns it into another form of wear and tear; he also pointed out game progress and character development rely excessively on time-consuming daily tasks and resource grinding. The new waiting period lacks a sense of reward and therefore does not respect the player's time.

In terms of the combat system, Biorudi affirmed that its action combat, centered around a four-person squad, is fast-paced and maintains a smooth but not overly complex rhythm through mechanisms such as perfect evasion, stance breakage, and chain attacks. Thwaites also called its combat "glamour" and had a distinct visual feedback, and praised the feel of switching members and connecting light attacks and special attacks to form combos. In contrast, Sinha criticized the combat for being repetitive and lacking tactical depth, often falling into a fixed style of play based on skill and combo cycles. Alston believed that the combat was long, boring, and highly repetitive, with enemies being tough but lacking a satisfying "power growth" feedback, and mentioned that cluttered screen information made dodging and parrying more frustrating. Kawanishi pointed out that although its action combat could support the world-building narrative atmosphere, it was still difficult to resolve the homogenization problem of the work within the gacha framework.

In terms of narrative, Thwaites believed that the beginning was laid out with a lot of explanatory text, and the pacing was awkward. However, after players got through the dialogue-heavy beginning, the game gradually unfolded and made up for the shortcomings with atmosphere and combat performance. Biorudi praised the game's narrative scale and emotional presentation as being of a high standard, believing that it was friendly to new players and could provide more world-building information for fans of the series. However, he also pointed out that some narrative atmospheres were slightly incongruous, such as non-player characters (NPCs) praising the protagonist excessively, and that the general NPCs had a rather standardized appearance. Sinha criticized the low plot tension, the sometimes dragging narrative pace, and the stiff dialogue (some information was repeatedly explained), and believed that the protagonist's characterization was not distinctive enough. Kawanishi pointed out that the work can provide space for reflection on technology and ethics, but its "thought-provoking story goals" and card-based structure are difficult to reconcile, resulting in insufficient overall recognizability. Alston also said that the narrative concept itself is interesting, but it is dragged down by a lot of explanatory dialogue and clichéd villain tropes.

Regarding payment and system complexity, Thwaites mentioned that the game includes a large amount of currency and resource systems, and has a paid battle pass to accelerate development; she said that she has not encountered strong obstacles to payment in the short term, but still believes that it remains to be seen whether it will create pressure to "have to spend money" in the later stages. Biorudi pointed out that there are still multiple currencies in the game, but the overall paid economic design is not confusing or overly annoying; Alston emphasized that the game still lacks substantial depth to support long-term investment due to the stacking of multiple systems, with impressions of "numerous menus" and "tutorial bombardment". In addition, Alston also mentioned that the game includes a tower defense mode, but its experience is more like additional content and has not yet shown enough depth to support the overall experience.

James Cunningham of Hardcore Gamer lauded Arknights: Endfield as "easily one of the best examples of gacha gaming", praising the combat system while criticizing the complex menu system. Reviewing the iOS version for Pocket Gamer, Jack Brassell summarized the game as "an engaging sci-fi RPG with a beautiful environment and exciting combat", particularly enjoying the variety of heroes to collect, though he found that conversations during cutscenes tended to drag on. In a review of the PlayStation 5 version, Sammy Barker of Push Square felt that despite its "lore-heavy narrative", the game was uplifted by "a strong battle system and outstanding PS5 optimisation".

=== Sales ===
Before the game's public beta, the official game company announced that Arknights: Endfield had over 35 million pre-registrations worldwide. On the first day of the public beta, Arknights: Endfield ranked 2nd on the iOS App Store's free app chart. The game was downloaded over 1 million times on the Google Play Store.According to statistics from Sensor Tower, over 70% of the revenue of the game in the first month came from the Asia-Pacific region, with the top 4 regions being Japan, mainland China, Southern Korean and the United States. Sensor Tower attributes the game's performance in Japan to a large-scale advertising push at the beginning of that month. According to statistics from Video Game Insights, more than 38% of players of the Play Station 5 version were from the United States and more than 15% were Japan players.

=== Accolades ===
Year	Award	Category	Result	Ref.
2026	Thailand Game Awards	Best Free to Play Game	Won	
2026	The Game Awards	Best Mobile Game	Pending	

== In popular culture ==
=== Gugu Gaga Penguin ===
In early 2026, an internet meme based on an AI-generated edit of the Endministrator known as Gugu Gaga Penguin (Chinese: 咕咕嘎嘎企鹅) began appearing on a number of social media platforms amid the release of new generative text-to-video models, such as Seedance 2.0. Originating from a post on 19 February 2026, the meme initially spread as short-form video, primarily on Chinese platforms Bilibili and Douyin. The popularity led to products such as figurines being sold on e-commerce marketplaces. Attempts to capitalize on the monetization of Gugu Gaga Penguin via copyright registration led to controversy and sparked discussion on the copyright eligibility of derivative works and of AI-generated content.
