= Sora (text-to-video model) =

OpenAI text-to-video models (2024–2026)

- Developer: OpenAI
- Release: December 9, 2024; 23 months ago
- Final release: Sora 2 / September 30, 2025; 13 months ago
- Platform: OpenAI
- Available in: English; Russian; Spanish; Turkish
- Type: Text-to-video model
- Website: sora.chatgpt.com at the Wayback Machine (archived March 25, 2026)

Sora is a discontinued text-to-video model and social media app developed by OpenAI. Using artificial intelligence, the model generated short video clips based on prompts, and could also extend existing short videos. In February 2024, OpenAI previewed examples of its output to the public, with the first generation of Sora released publicly for ChatGPT Plus and ChatGPT Pro users in the United States and Canada in December 2024.

The second generation of Sora was released to select users in the US and Canada at the end of September 2025. Sora 2 integrated social media features into the app. The app was shut down on April 26, 2026 and the application programming interface (API) was discontinued on September 24, 2026, marking the end of the Sora AI brand as a whole.

By default, the generator used copyrighted material in its videos, unless copyright holders actively opt out of having their content included. Videos contained a visible, moving digital watermark to prevent misuse, but a week after Sora 2's release, third-party programs became available which could remove the watermark.

== Background ==
A woman walking down a Tokyo street at night, first generation, February 2024

Several other models capable of generating video from text had been created prior to Sora, including Meta's Make‑A‑Video, Runway's Gen‑2 and Google Veo. OpenAI, the company behind Sora, had released DALL·E 3, the third of its DALL-E text-to-image models, in September 2023.

== History ==
=== Initial release ===
The team that developed Sora named it after the Japanese word for 'sky' to signify its "limitless creative potential". On February 15, 2024, OpenAI first previewed Sora by releasing multiple clips of high-definition videos that it had created, including an SUV driving down a mountain road, an animation of a "short fluffy monster" next to a candle, two people walking through Tokyo in the snow, and fake historical footage of the California gold rush. OpenAI stated that it was able to generate videos as long as one minute. The company then shared a technical report that highlighted the methods used to train the model. OpenAI CEO Sam Altman also posted a series of tweets responding to Twitter users' prompts with Sora-generated videos of the prompts.

As of December 9, 2024, OpenAI had gradually made Sora available to the public for ChatGPT Pro and ChatGPT Plus users in the U.S. and Canada. Prior to this, the company had provided limited access to a small "red team", including experts in misinformation and bias, to perform adversarial testing on the model. The company also shared Sora with a small group of creative professionals, including video makers and artists, to seek feedback on its usefulness in creative fields. In February 2025, OpenAI announced plans to integrate Sora into ChatGPT by letting users generate Sora videos from the chatbot.

=== Sora 2 ===
A compilation video generated using Sora 2

Sora 2 was unveiled on September 30, 2025, with an iOS app at the same time, as well as an Android app two months later. All videos generated by the model feature a visible, moving watermark to prevent misuse of the tool. The previous version of Sora also added a safety watermark to allow viewers to distinguish between real and fictional content. On October 7, 404 Media reported that third-party programs that could remove the watermark from Sora 2 videos had become prevalent. Many outlets, such as Wired magazine, have noted that the Sora 2 app is overtly similar to TikTok in style and features.

=== Discontinuation ===
On March 24, 2026, OpenAI announced on X that it was discontinuing Sora in both the mobile app and the API. The Sora app was shut down on April 26, 2026, while the API was shut down on September 24, 2026. OpenAI's partnership with Disney, which included a licensing agreement allowing Disney characters to be used within Sora, was also coming to an end. The decision prompted British technology news website The Register to label OpenAI a "product-killer", following in the footsteps of other technology companies such as Google, Amazon Web Services, Broadcom, Cloud Software Group, and Netscape.

OpenAI did not provide a specific reason for discontinuing Sora in its shutdown notice. The reports that emerged regarding this discontinuity linked the decision to computation shortages, cost pressures, and a broader shift toward core enterprise products. Following its public launch, Sora's worldwide users peaked at around a million before declining to fewer than 500,000, while the service cost an estimated $1 million per day to operate due to the computational demands of video generation.

== Legal regulation ==
In November 2024, an API key for Sora access was leaked by a group of testers on Hugging Face who posted a manifesto stating that they were protesting that Sora was used for "art washing". OpenAI revoked all access three hours after the leak was made public and stated that "hundreds of artists" have shaped the development and that "participation is voluntary".

At the time of its launch, Sora 2 allowed copyrighted content by default unless copyright holders contacted OpenAI to restrict the generation of their content on the platform. On October 3, 2025, OpenAI stated that a future update to Sora 2 would give copyright holders "more granular control" over the generation of copyrighted content, but the company did not state whether existing content would be removed. On October 6, the chairman of the MPA criticized OpenAI's approach to copyright with Sora 2.

On December 11, 2025, the Walt Disney Company announced that it would invest $1 billion in OpenAI, in a three-year licensing deal, to allow users on Disney+ to generate more than 200 of its copyrighted characters on Sora 2. These characters include those from Disney Animation, Pixar, Marvel Studios, and Star Wars.

== Capabilities and limitations ==
A video generated by Sora of someone lying in a bed with a cat on it, containing several mistakes

A video generated by Sora of the Glenfinnan Viaduct in Scotland, with several inaccuracies such as two tracks instead of one, trains running on the right instead of the left, a second chimney on the locomotive in its interpretation of the train The Jacobite, inconsistent carriage lengths, and a carriage bending along its length as it rounds the turn.

The technology behind Sora is an adaptation of the technology behind DALL-E 3. According to OpenAI, Sora is a diffusion transformer, a denoising latent diffusion model with one transformer as its denoiser. A video is generated in latent space by denoising 3D "patches", then transformed to standard space by a video decompressor. Recaptioning is employed to augment training data by using a video-to-text model to create detailed captions for videos.

OpenAI trained the model using publicly available videos as well as copyrighted videos licensed for the purpose, but did not reveal the number or the exact source of the videos. Upon its release, OpenAI acknowledged some of Sora's shortcomings, including its limited capacity to simulate complex physics, to understand causality and to differentiate left from right. OpenAI also stated that, in adherence to the company's existing safety practices, Sora will restrict text prompts for sexual, violent, hateful or celebrity imagery, as well as content featuring existing intellectual property.

Sora researcher Tim Brooks stated that the model learned how to create 3D graphics from its dataset alone, while fellow Sora researcher Bill Peebles said that the model automatically created different video angles without being prompted. According to OpenAI, Sora-generated videos are also tagged with C2PA metadata to indicate that they are AI-processed.

=== Comparison with other models ===
The Artificial Analysis have placed Sora 2 pro lower than other text-to-video AI generators in the market on its leaderboard. Other models, such as Seedance 2.0 from ByteDance, Runway 4.5 from Runway, and Kling 3.0 from KlingAI, have ranked higher than Sora 2.0.

== Reception ==
=== Positive ===
In 2024, Will Douglas Heaven of the MIT Technology Review called the demonstration videos "impressive", but noted that they must have been cherry-picked and may not be representative of Sora's typical output. Lisa Lacy of CNET called its example videos "remarkably realistic – except perhaps when a human face appears close up or when sea creatures are swimming".

In October 2025, The New York Times remarked that the release of the Sora 2 app in September 2025 was "jaw-dropping (for better and worse)" though also remarked that the app was a "social network in disguise" and "the type of product that companies like Meta and X have sought to build: a way to bring A.I. to the masses that people can share." The article expressed concern regarding the product's potential impact on society and its potential use to promote misinformation, disinformation, and scams.

A 2025 study in Science Advances found that generative AI tools can lower barriers to entry in creative work. It enables users with diverse skill sets, including people with less formal artistic training and technical skills, to act on their creative and imaginative ideas. The lower barrier to entry allows such users previously locked out of the creative industry to produce content and easily act on their creative ideas.

=== Negative ===
Some internet users and online content creators, such as Hank Green, called the mobile app "SlopTok," a reference to both the mobile app TikTok and the term AI slop. Filmmaker Tyler Perry announced he would be putting a planned $800 million expansion of his Atlanta studio on hold, expressing concern about Sora's potential impact on the film industry.

OpenAI came under controversy over character generation after Sora 2 produced several videos that featured copyrighted characters. The company stated it would work with rights holders to block characters from Sora at their request, giving copyright holders more control. In October 2025, Japan's Content Overseas Distribution Association submitted a request to OpenAI demanding that it stop using the copyrighted content of its member companies, including Studio Ghibli and Square Enix.

Various estates of celebrities have threatened legal action against OpenAI's Sora 2 app, due to deepfake videos being created of their likeness, including celebrities who have died. Family members of the late celebrities Robin Williams, Kobe Bryant, Paul Walker, and George Carlin also urged OpenAI to take action against "hurtful videos" and to restrict deepfakes of their loved ones. OpenAI restricted users from making videos of the late Martin Luther King Jr., and gave estates the ability to opt out of those they represent.

American academic Oren Etzioni expressed concerns over the technology's ability to create online disinformation for political campaigns. For Wired, Steven Levy similarly wrote that it had the potential to become "a misinformation train wreck" and opined that its preview clips were "impressive" but "not perfect" and that it "show[ed] an emergent grasp of cinematic grammar" due to its unprompted shot changes. Levy added, "[i]t will be a very long time, if ever, before text-to-video threatens actual filmmaking."

A commentary by the Brookings Institution argued that tools such as Sora and other AI video and image generators can create job losses in creative industries by automating production tasks previously performed by writers, designers, editors, artists, and other film-production workers. The Brookings Institution also talked about a 2024 study. This study reported that 75% of film companies that had adopted AI reduced the workload by a great margin till the need for employees lowered, which led to these companies reducing, consolidating, or eliminating jobs. More than 100,000 U.S. entertainment jobs could be at risk of disappearing by 2026.

Disney's three-year licensing deal with Sora, inked in December 2025, was met with concern and skepticism across social media platforms. The following day SAG-AFTRA, Writers Guild of America and The Animation Guild sent an open letter to The Walt Disney Company stating their concerns about the licensing deal with WAG mentioning that the deal is a ‘Theft of Our Work". SAG-AFTRA would mention that they "will closely monitor the deal and its implementation to ensure compliance". The following week Polygon will make a reference to the deal in their review of the short film Teenage Mutant Ninja Turtles: Chrome Alone 2 – Lost in New Jersey produced by Paramount Pictures, Point Grey Pictures and Nickelodeon Movies, calling the short "timely" and "yet, as Mickey Mouse seems content to accelerate AI's oncoming judgement day, another group of legacy characters are taking a katana-pointed stand in opposition".

== In popular culture ==
The episode "Sora Not Sorry" from South Park is a satire that critiques AI deepfake videos and copyright issues surrounding generative AI models, with the title being a reference to Sora.

== See also ==
- Runway Gen
- VideoPoet
- Google Veo
- Dream Machine
- Seedance
- LTX (AI Model)
