= Yonghui Wu =

Chinese computer scientist

Yonghui Wu is a Chinese computer scientist. He spent seventeen years at Google, where he was named Google Fellow in 2023, and served as Vice President of Research at Google DeepMind. He later became head of basic research at ByteDance's Seed division.

He is best known as the first author of the 2016 paper "Google's Neural Machine Translation System: Bridging the Gap between Human and Machine Translation" (GNMT). After the system was deployed across Google Translate, it reduced translation errors by an average of roughly 60 percent compared with the previous phrase-based production system.
