= Hell Grind =

- Directed by: Aitore Zholdaskali
- Written by: Aitore Zholdaskali; Adilkhan Yerzhanov
- Release date: May 21, 2026 (Cannes)
- Running time: 95 minutes
- Language: English
- Budget: $500,000

Hell Grind is a 2026 action fantasy film directed by Aitore Zholdaskali and co-written with Adilkhan Yerzhanov.

The entire film was created by a team of 15 people using generative AI tools from San Francisco-based startup Higgsfield AI. It premiered in May 2026 in Cannes, France, at the same time as the 2026 Cannes Film Festival, albeit not at the festival.

== Premise ==
The film follows four street thieves. Roco, Lulu, Jax (J) and Rein (Range). After a botched heist, one of them is transported into an underworld. The others team up with a secret military group and battle demon hordes to save her.

== Characters ==
- Roco: The crew's leader and mastermind. He runs the operations, maps out the plans, and makes the critical choices. When he accidentally sets off the underworld relic, his journey quickly turns into a dark exploration of tragic grief as he fights to rescue his lover.
- Lulu: The crew’s stealth specialist, recognized for having incredibly fast hands. She can silently sneak into tight locations and retrieve any object unnoticed. She shares a deep bond with Roco, who refers to her as the most beautiful girl he has ever seen.
- Jax (J): The team's highly unpredictable explosives expert. Jax handles the raw firepower and is responsible for blowing past obstacle security boundaries when a heist goes loud.
- Rein (Range): The tech prodigy of the group. Equipped with her tablet, she possesses the engineering skills to hack complex systems to keep the crew from getting caught.

== Production ==
Creation of Hell Grind took two weeks and cost US$500,000, with 80% of that going into generative AI compute costs. The 15-person crew, including some of the Higgsfield team, used Higgsfield's Soul Cinema and Soul Cast products, with the Dreamina Seedance 2.0 video generator to generate the film's visuals.

According to Adil Alimzhanov, a content lead at Higgsfield, the core of the production involved generating and re-generating 15 second clips until they were refined enough for use. To maintain shot-to-shot consistency, each prompt had to be long and detailed, containing an average of 3,000 words each, and words and phrases to remind the video generation model to respect laws of physics, specify intended cinematographic choices, and avoiding a telltale "AI sheen". Higgsfield CEO, Alex Mashrabov, described some of the video generation process as having "a feeling of a slot machine".

== Release ==
The film was screened at an industry event hosted in Cannes, France on May 16, 2026. A trailer was released a few days later.
