= Text-to-video model =

Machine learning model

A compilation video generated using OpenAI's Sora 2 text-to-video model

A text-to-video model is a form of generative AI that uses a natural language description as input to produce a video relevant to the input text. Advancements during the 2020s in the generation of high-quality, text-conditioned videos have largely been driven by the development of video diffusion models.

== Models ==
There are different models, including open source models. Chinese-language input CogVideo is the earliest text-to-video model "of 9.4 billion parameters" to be developed, with its demo version of open source codes first presented on GitHub in 2022. That year, Meta Platforms released a partial text-to-video model called "Make-A-Video", and Google's Brain (later Google DeepMind) introduced Imagen Video, a text-to-video model with 3D U-Net.

=== 2023 ===
In February 2023, Runway released Gen-1 and Gen-2, among the first commercially available text-to-video and video-to-video models accessible to the public through a web interface. Gen-1, initially released as a video-to-video model, allowed users to transform existing video footage using text or image prompts. Gen-2, introduced in March 2023 and made publicly available in June 2023, added text-to-video capabilities, enabling users to generate videos from text prompts alone.

In March 2023, a research paper titled "VideoFusion: Decomposed Diffusion Models for High-Quality Video Generation" was published, presenting a novel approach to video generation. The VideoFusion model decomposes the diffusion process into two components: base noise and residual noise, which are shared across frames to ensure temporal coherence. By utilizing a pre-trained image diffusion model as a base generator, the model efficiently generated high-quality and coherent videos. Fine-tuning the pre-trained model on video data addressed the domain gap between image and video data, enhancing the model's ability to produce realistic and consistent video sequences. In the same month, Adobe introduced Firefly AI as part of its features.

=== 2024 ===
In January 2024, Google announced development of a text-to-video model named Lumiere which is anticipated to integrate advanced video editing capabilities. Matthias Niessner and Lourdes Agapito at AI company Synthesia work on developing 3D neural rendering techniques that can synthesise realistic video by using 2D and 3D neural representations of shape, appearances, and motion for controllable video synthesis of avatars. In June 2024, Luma Labs launched its Dream Machine video tool. That same month, Kuaishou extended its Kling AI text-to-video model to international users. In July 2024, TikTok owner ByteDance released Jimeng AI in China, through its subsidiary, Faceu Technology. By September 2024, the Chinese AI company MiniMax debuted its video-01 model, joining other established AI model companies like Zhipu AI, Baichuan, and Moonshot AI, which contribute to China's involvement in AI technology. In December 2024 Lightricks launched LTX Video as an open source model.

=== 2025 ===
Alternative approaches to text-to-video models include Google's Phenaki, Hour One, Colossyan, Runway's Gen-3 Alpha, and OpenAI's Sora, Several additional text-to-video models, such as Plug-and-Play, Text2LIVE, and TuneAVideo, have emerged. FLUX.1 developer Black Forest Labs has announced its text-to-video model SOTA. Google was preparing to launch a video generation tool named Veo for YouTube Shorts in 2025. In May 2025, Google launched the Veo 3 iteration of the model. It was noted for its impressive audio generation capabilities, which were a previous limitation for text-to-video models. In July 2025 Lightricks released an update to LTX Video capable of generating clips reaching 60 seconds, and in October 2025 it released LTX-2, with audio capabilities built in.

=== 2026 ===
In February 2026, ByteDance released Seedance 2.0, it was noted for its impressive realistic generation, motion and camera control and 15 second generation, however the model faced huge criticism from Motion Picture Association for copyright infringement. After viewing a viral clip of a fight between actors Brad Pitt and Tom Cruise, Rhett Reese, who is the co-writer of Deadpool & Wolverine and Zombieland announced that on social media "I hate to say it. It’s likely over for us," further stating that "In next to no time, one person is going to be able to sit at a computer and create a movie indistinguishable from what Hollywood now releases."

In July 2026, ByteDance released Seedance 2.5, a new SOTA for text-to-video models, now being able to generate 30 second native videos with 50 multimodal references as input. Major features also include 4k videos and local editing like instead of regenerating an entire 30-second clip if one detail (like a character's hair color) is incorrect, users can now modify specific areas within the scene to fix it. This prevents the loss of preferred acting performances, facial expressions, or lighting established in the original take. Seedance 2.5 also includes a beta long-video mode extending clips to 3 minutes.

In June 2026, text-to-video technology saw increased adoption in feature-length film production. Utopai Studios announced a collaboration with South Korean filmmaker Hyo-joo Yang to produce Half Moon, an animated feature combining traditional animation techniques with generative AI video tools. Principal photography for the project commenced in Germany by September 2026, marking a notable integration of generative video models into international commercial animation pipelines.

== Architecture and training ==
There are several architectures that have been used to create text-to-video models. Similar to text-to-image models, these models can be trained using Recurrent Neural Networks (RNNs) such as long short-term memory (LSTM) networks, which has been used for Pixel Transformation Models and Stochastic Video Generation Models, which aid in consistency and realism respectively. An alternative for these include transformer models. Generative adversarial networks (GANs), Variational autoencoders (VAEs), — which can aid in the prediction of human motion — and diffusion models have also been used to develop the image generation aspects of the model.

Text-video datasets used to train models include, but are not limited to, WebVid-10M, HDVILA-100M, CCV, ActivityNet, and Panda-70M. These datasets contain millions of original videos of interest, generated videos, captioned-videos, and textual information that help train models for accuracy. Text-video datasets used to train models include, but are not limited to PromptSource, DiffusionDB, and VidProM. These datasets provide the range of text inputs needed to teach models how to interpret a variety of textual prompts.

The video generation process involves synchronizing the text inputs with video frames, ensuring alignment and consistency throughout the sequence. This predictive process is subject to decline in quality as the length of the video increases due to resource limitations. The Will Smith eating spaghetti test is a benchmark for models.

== Limitations ==
Text-to-video models can be computationally demanding, which can limit the quality and duration of generated outputs. They also require large amounts of specific training data to produce high-quality, coherent videos, which can limit access to model development and use.

Models may misinterpret prompts and produce videos that differ from the intended meaning because they do not fully capture semantic context. Benchmarks have also found limitations in physical plausibility. In a 2025 evaluation of ten open-source and commercial systems, all scored below 0.60 on average in each of 12 physical-law categories; more detailed prompt hints did not eliminate violations. A survey of long-video generation found that systems often struggled to maintain consistent character appearances and scene layouts in videos longer than 16 seconds.

Text and fine details in generated videos may also appear garbled, including distorted hands and unreadable text.

== Ethics ==
The deployment of text-to-video models raises ethical considerations related to content generation. These models have the potential to create inappropriate or unauthorized content, including explicit material, graphic violence, misinformation, and likenesses of real individuals without consent. Ensuring that AI-generated content complies with established standards for safe and ethical usage is essential, as content generated by these models may not always be easily identified as harmful or misleading. The ability of AI to recognize and filter out NSFW or copyrighted content remains an ongoing challenge, with implications for both creators and audiences.

== Impacts and applications ==
Propaganda produced by Iranian media company Explosive Media during the 2026 Iran war. Note the use of Lego-style animation using a text-to-video model.

A 2026 qualitative study of AI-generated viral short-video production in China described creators using Chinese video-generation tools such as Jimeng and Kling and distributing content across platforms including Douyin, Kuaishou, WeChat Channels, TikTok and Instagram. The study reported that some creators benchmarked already-viral videos and tested variations to develop repeatable formats for reaching audiences.

A qualitative interview study of Generation Z users in Vietnam found that visual style, voice, storytelling and disclosure of AI authorship shaped participants' judgments of authenticity and trust in AI-generated short-form videos on social media.

During the Russo-Ukrainian war, fake videos made with artificial intelligence were created as part of a propaganda war against Ukraine and shared in social media. These included depictions of children in the Ukrainian military uniform, videos falsely attributed Ukrainian television which call for children to report siblings who listen to Russian music, or fictitious statements by Ukrainian President Volodymyr Zelenskyy about the country's surrender, among others.

== Comparison of models ==
Model/Product	Company	Year released	Status	Key features	Capabilities	Pricing	Video length	Supported languages
Synthesia	Synthesia	2019	Released	AI avatars, multilingual support for 60+ languages, customization options	Specialized in realistic AI avatars for corporate training and marketing	Subscription-based, starting around $30/month	Varies based on subscription	60+
Vexub	Vexub	2023	Released	Text-to-video from prompt, focus on TikTok and YouTube storytelling formats for social media	Generates AI videos (1–15 mins) from text prompts; includes editing and voice features	Subscription-based, with various plans	Up to ~15 minutes	70+
InVideo AI	InVideo	2021	Released	AI-powered video creation, large stock library, AI talking avatars	Tailored for social media content with platform-specific templates	Free plan available, Paid plans starting at $16/month	Varies depending on content type	Multiple (not specified)
Fliki	Fliki AI	2022	Released	Text-to-video with AI avatars and voices, extensive language and voice support	Supports 65+ AI avatars and 2,000+ voices in 70 languages	Free plan available, Paid plans starting at $30/month	Varies based on subscription	70+
Runway Gen-2	Runway AI	2023	Released	Multimodal video generation from text, images, or videos	High-quality visuals, various modes like stylization and storyboard	Free trial, Paid plans (details not specified)	Up to 16 seconds	Multiple (not specified)
Pika Labs	Pika Labs	2024	Beta	Dynamic video generation, camera and motion customization	User-friendly, focused on natural dynamic generation	Currently free during beta	Flexible, supports longer videos with frame continuation	Multiple (not specified)
Runway Gen-3 Alpha	Runway AI	2024	Alpha	Enhanced visual fidelity, photorealistic humans, fine-grained temporal control	Ultra-realistic video generation with precise key-framing and industry-level customization	Free trial available, custom pricing for enterprises	Up to 10 seconds per clip, extendable	Multiple (not specified)
Google Veo	Google	2024	Released	Google Gemini prompting, voice acting, sound effects, background music. Cinema style realistic videos.	Can generate very realistic and detailed character models/scenes/clips, with accommodating and matching voice acting, ambient sounds, and background music. Ability to extend clips with continuity.	Varies ($250 Google Pro/Ultra AI subscription, and additional AI credit Top-Ups)	Eight seconds for individual clips (however clips can be continued/extended as separate clips)	50+
OpenAI Sora	OpenAI	2024	Closed	Deep language understanding, high-quality cinematic visuals, multi-shot videos	Capable of creating detailed, dynamic, and emotionally expressive videos; still under development with safety measures	Credit-based subscription, part of paid plans	Up to 25 seconds	Multiple (not specified)
LTX	Lightricks	2024	Released	Unified audio/video generation, with multiple controls	Can be conditioned and promted via text, images, video or audio.	Open Source	Can be extended up to 60 seconds	Multiple (not specified)
Runway Gen-4	Runway	2025	Released	Consistent characters across scenes, world consistency, camera control, physics simulation	Generates 5-10 second clips with consistent characters, objects, and environments across multiple shots	Credit-based subscription, part of paid plans	5–10 seconds	Multiple (not specified)
Firefly	Adobe	2024	Released	Prompt-based editing, camera motion controls, 3rd party models	Creating motion from a prompt or single frame with reference video	Credit-based subscription	Up to 5 seconds	
Kling	Kuaishou	2024	Released					
Seedance 2.5	ByteDance Seed	2026	Released	Prompt to video	Deep language understanding, high-quality cinematic visuals, multi-shot videos	Credit-based subscription	30 seconds	Multiple (not specified)
HappyHorse 1.1	Alibaba	2026	Released	Prompt to video	Deep language understanding, high-quality cinematic visuals, multi-shot videos		Up to 15 seconds	Multiple (not specified)
PAI	Utopai Studios	2026	Released	AI filmmaking and storytelling platform with a Creative Agent and Story Agent, script-to-shot planning, storyboard generation, multi-shot production, multi-turn editing, character and environment consistency, voice and dialogue generation, and 4K output	Designed for long-form cinematic storytelling rather than isolated short clips; supports script development, character and environment continuity, shot planning, camera control, scene-level editing, asset management, localization, and final video assembly. Utopai states that PAI supports up to 180 seconds of continuous 4K generation.	Subscription and credit-based pricing; public plans range from $15/month for Basic to $379/month for Ultra, with additional credit top-ups available. 4K video is listed for the Pro plan and above.	Up to 180 seconds of continuous generation, according to Utopai; longer projects can be assembled from multiple shots	Multiple; exact language count not publicly specified. Supports dialogue, narration, voice input, and lip synchronization

== See also ==
- Text-to-image model
- AI slop
- VideoPoet, unreleased Google's model, precursor of Lumiere
- Deepfake
- Human image synthesis
