= Dream Machine (text-to-video model) =

Video-generating machine learning model

- A video created with Dream Machine by director Ellenor Argyropoulos of an ancient Egyptian girl
- Developer: Luma Labs
- Release: June 12, 2024
- Type: Text-to-video model
- Website: lumalabs.ai/dream-machine

Dream Machine was a text-to-video model created by Luma Labs and launched in June 2024. It generates video output based on user prompts or still images. Dream Machine has been noted for its ability to realistically capture motion, while some critics have remarked upon the lack of transparency about its training data.

== History ==
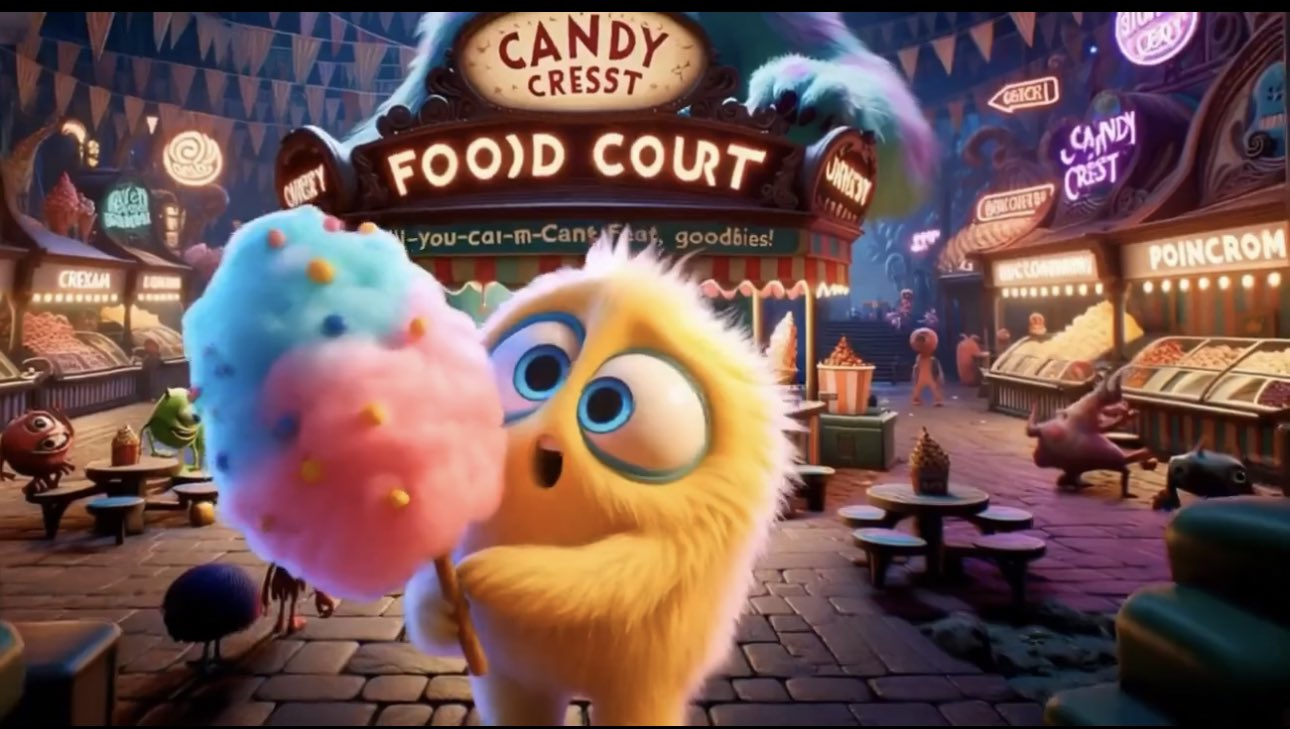
Monster Camp, a movie trailer generated by Dream Machine, features the Monsters, Inc. character Mike Wazowski in the background of one scene.

Dream Machine was a text-to-video model created by the San Francisco-based generative artificial intelligence company Luma Labs, which had previously created Genie, a 3D model generator. It was released to the public on June 12, 2024, which was announced by the company in a post on X alongside examples of videos it created. Soon after its release, users on social media posted video versions of images generated with Midjourney, as well as moving recreations of artworks such as Girl with a Pearl Earring and memes such as Doge, Picard facepalm, Success Kid, and distracted boyfriend. One video, a trailer for a fictional animated movie titled Monster Camp, was reposted by Luma Labs on their X account. Users on the platform criticized the video as stealing the aesthetic of the Monsters, Inc. franchise, also pointing out that Mike Wazowski, a character from the franchise, appears in the trailer. Another video posted by director Ellenor Argyropoulos of a Pixar-style animation of a girl in ancient Egypt created with Dream Machine went viral online.

As of September 2026, new users can only sign up for Luma Agents.at the official website.

== Capabilities ==
As of June 2024, users can create videos with Dream Machine, which are five seconds long and 1360 × 752 pixels, by signing up with their Google account and typing in a prompt or using a still image. Dream Machine alters the prompt based on its own large language model. Users can create 10 videos a day and 30 videos for free with Dream Machine. The program also offers Standard, Pro, and Premier subscription plans, which allow users to create 120, 400, and 2,000 videos, respectively. Dream Machine's website states that its videos have difficulty depicting text and motion. Luma Labs has stated that it has plans to release a developer-friendly API for Dream Machine. The week after its release, Luma Labs announced that it would be adding the ability to extend videos, a discovery feature, and in-video editing.

== Reception ==
Critics compared Dream Machine heavily to Sora, a text-to-video model created by OpenAI, and Kling, another text-to-video model, upon its release. Charles Pulliam-Moore of The Verge wrote that "bullish fans" of generative AI "were quick to call [Dream Machine] a novel innovation", but remarked upon its training data not being available to the public. Mark Wilson of TechRadar also noted that it was unclear what Dream Machine's training data was, which he said "means that its potential outside of personal use or improving your GIF game could be limited", but wrote that it was "certainly a fun tool to test drive" as "a taster of the more advanced (and no doubt more expensive) AI video generators to come". For Tom's Guide, Ryan Morrison called Dream Machine "one of the best prompt following and motion understanding AI video models yet" and "an impressive next step in generative AI video", but that "it is still falling short of what is needed". Mashable's Chase DiBenedetto described user-created Dream Machine videos circulating on social media as "eerily-moving" and "Harry Potter-esque".

== See also ==
- Sora (text-to-video model)
- Veo (text-to-video model)
- LTX (text-to-video model)
- Seedance
