= Will Smith eating spaghetti test =

Informal benchmark for text-to-video models

Original 2023 AI-generated clip posted on Reddit

The Will Smith eating spaghetti test is a benchmark used to assess the capabilities of generative video models in rendering realistic human actions and facial expressions. Originating from a widely shared AI-generated video in 2023, which depicted an unnaturally animated render of actor Will Smith eating spaghetti, the test has since been used informally to evaluate and demonstrate the capabilities and limitations of AI-generated video content.

== Origin ==
On March 27, 2023, Reddit user chaindrop shared an AI-generated video titled "Will Smith eating spaghetti" on the StableDiffusion subreddit, created using ModelScope's text-to-video tool. The clip depicted a distorted and surreal version of actor Will Smith eating spaghetti. The video quickly gained attention for its uncanny visuals, with Smith's facial features morphing unpredictably and his eating motions appearing unnatural. The unsettling nature of the video led to widespread sharing and discussions across social media platforms.

== Spread ==
The original video went viral and prompted a number of parodies and reinterpretations by netizens. In February 2024, Will Smith himself joined the trend by posting a parody video on Instagram, mimicking the AI-generated clip and captioning it, "This is getting out of hand!"

== Use as a benchmark ==
Google Veo 3's rendition

The prompt became a benchmark for evaluating the realism and coherence of AI-generated videos. As large language models advanced, developers and other users use the test to identify improvements. In May 2025, Google's Veo 3, an AI video generation tool, produced a rendition of the test that showcased significant enhancements in facial accuracy, motion fluidity, and audio synchronization. Despite the improvements, viewers observed minor inconsistencies, such as unusually crunchy sound effects accompanying the spaghetti consumption. A version created with Veo 3.1 in October 2025 was noted by Business Insider for being more realistic. In February 2026, Forbes stated that Seedance 2.0 had passed the test through its response to the prompt.

== See also ==
- AI slop
- Deepfake
- Synthetic media
- Human image synthesis
- Generative adversarial network
- Hiroshi Abe's home page - website of an actor used for benchmarking gadgets
