= Synthesia (company) =

English artificial intelligence company

Synthesia Limited
- Logo
- Type: Private
- Industry: Artificial intelligence
- Founded: 2017; 9 years ago
- Founder: Lourdes Agapito; Matthias Niessner; Victor Riparbelli; Steffen Tjerrild
- Headquarters: London, United Kingdom
- Area served: Worldwide
- Products: Synthetic media Video editing software
- Number of employees: 550 (2025)
- Website: www.synthesia.io

Synthesia Limited is a British multinational artificial intelligence company based in London, United Kingdom. It is a synthetic media-generation software developer and creator of AI-generated video content, including audio-visual agents and cloned avatars. Britain's largest generative-AI firm, it is used by 70% of FTSE 100 and over 90% of Fortune 100 companies.

== Overview ==
Synthesia is most often used by corporations for localized communication, orientation, employee training videos, advertising campaigns, reporting, product demonstrations, customer service, and to create chatbots.

Its software algorithm mimics speech and facial movements based on video recordings of an individual’s speech and facial expressions. From this, a text-to-speech video is created to look and sound like the individual. Swiss bank UBS incorporated Synthesia AI-powered avatars of their human financial experts, for instance, in 2025.

Users create content via the platform's pre-generated AI presenters or by creating digital representations of themselves, or personal avatars, using the platform's AI video editing tool. These avatars can be used to narrate videos generated from text. As of August 2021, Synthesia's voice database included multiple gender options in over 60 languages. Its free voice library doubled by 2025, to 140 languages and accents, and its Express-Voice technology can clone a user's own voice, or generate a synthetic one.

=== Deepfakes ===
The platform prohibits use of its software to create non-consensual clones, including of celebrities or political figures for satirical purposes. Explicit consent must be provided in addition to a strict pre-screening regimen for use of an individual's likeness to avoid “deepfaking”.

While the company prohibits use of its technology for misinformation or "news-like content", an October 2023 Freedom House report stated that Synthesia tools had been used by governments in Venezuela, China, Burkina Faso, and Russia to create videos of fake TV news outlets with AI-generated avatars in order to spread propaganda. Actor Dan Dewhirst signed a contract with the company in 2021, becoming one of the first actors whose likeness would be made into an AI avatar, finding his likeness used in the Venezuelan generated-videos. The company stated, in February 2024, that it had improved its misuse detection systems, and, in April 2024, that new users of its technology are screened by the company, and content employing it is further vetted by Synthesia moderators.

== History ==
Synthesia's software utilizes deep learning architecture developed by Lourdes Agapito and Matthias Niessner. The company was co-founded in 2017 by Agapito, Niessner, Victor Riparbelli, and Steffen Tjerrild. In 2018, the company first demonstrated the software's capabilities on the BBC programme Click when it presented a digitization of Matthew Amroliwala speaking Spanish, Mandarin, and Hindi. Through Synthesia's first two years of existence, it employed 10 people and struggled to make sales, leading to an expansion of the company's focus. It moved on from just targeting entertainment studios to a variety of businesses.

In 2020, Synthesia users were reported to include Amazon, Tiffany & Co. and IHG Hotels & Resorts.

In January 2024, the company introduced its AI video assistant, which turns text-to-video. That April, with a reported 55,000 customers, including half of the Fortune 100, Synthesia launched "expressive avatars". That September, an enhanced dubbing feature was launched, to translate video in 30 languages with naturalized lip-syncing.

Peter Hill joined Synthesia as CTO in January 2025, following 25 years at Amazon, and two years as CEO and CPO of Wildfire Studios. That March, a million dollar base of shares was formed to furnish human actors, employed to generate digital avatars, with company stock, which all of its employees hold. By June of that year, 150,000 individuals from among Synthesia's 65,000 customers had created AI-generated avatars of themselves.

In July 2025, the company's new global headquarters at Regent’s Place was opened by London mayor Sadiq Khan, who described Britain's largest generative-AI company, then valued at over $2 billion, as a "London success story". By that October, its technology was employed by 90% of the Fortune 100, and Synthesia 3.0 was launched, with hyper-realistic digital avatars equipped with AI-powered dubbing and translation, and a built-in video assistant. In January 2026, it reached a $4 billion valuation, with 70% of FTSE 100 companies noted among its customers.

In April 2026, Synthesia announced an expansion of its international offices, including new locations in Austin and Berlin and an expanded presence in Paris and Zurich.

=== Funding ===
The company raised $3.1 million in seed funding in 2019. In April 2021, the company raised $12.5 million in Series A funding. In December 2021, it raised $50 million in a Series B funding round led by Kleiner Perkins and GV (then Google Ventures).

Synthesia gained a total valuation of $1 billion, and achieved unicorn status, when it raised $90 million from Accel and Nvidia partnership NVentures, in June 2023, during its Series C funding round.

Counting 60,000 customers by January 2025, including over 60% of Fortune 100 companies; the company raised $180 million in a Series D round led by NEA, with new investors World Innovation Lab (WiL), Atlassian Ventures and PSP Growth, as well as existing investors GV, MMC Ventures and FirstMark, doubling Synthesia's valuation to $2.1 billion. Capital raised by 2025 had reached $330 million, with investments slated to further product innovation, talent growth, and company expansion in North America, Europe, Japan and Australia.

In April 2025, Adobe Inc. invested £10 million in the company for a strategic partnership. Synthesia subsequently rejected a $3 billion acquisition offer from Adobe, choosing to remain independent. With a revenue stream then exceeding $100 million annually; GV led a Series E funding round in October 2025, resulting in Synthesia's $4 billion valuation, raising $200 million from GV, Nvidia and Accel to develop, in 2026, interactive audio-visual avatar "agents" that converse on topic, for automated sales training and corporate communications, such as recruiting. The foillowing year, Synthesia launched Syren, an AI agent that generates videos from existing work through its chat interface, or via a separate app, with ChatGPT integrating Syren as a plug-in in October 2026.

== Recognition ==
In 2021, Synthesia partnered with Lay's to create the Messi Messages campaign featuring Argentine footballer Lionel Messi. Users created personalized messages with Synthesia's software and sent custom artificial reality video messages from Messi based on their text input. The campaign received a Cannes Lion Award under the Bronze category.

In February 2025, UK Science and Technology Minister Peter Kyle commended Synthesia's "pioneering generative AI innovations."
