= Li Xian videography =

Chinese actor

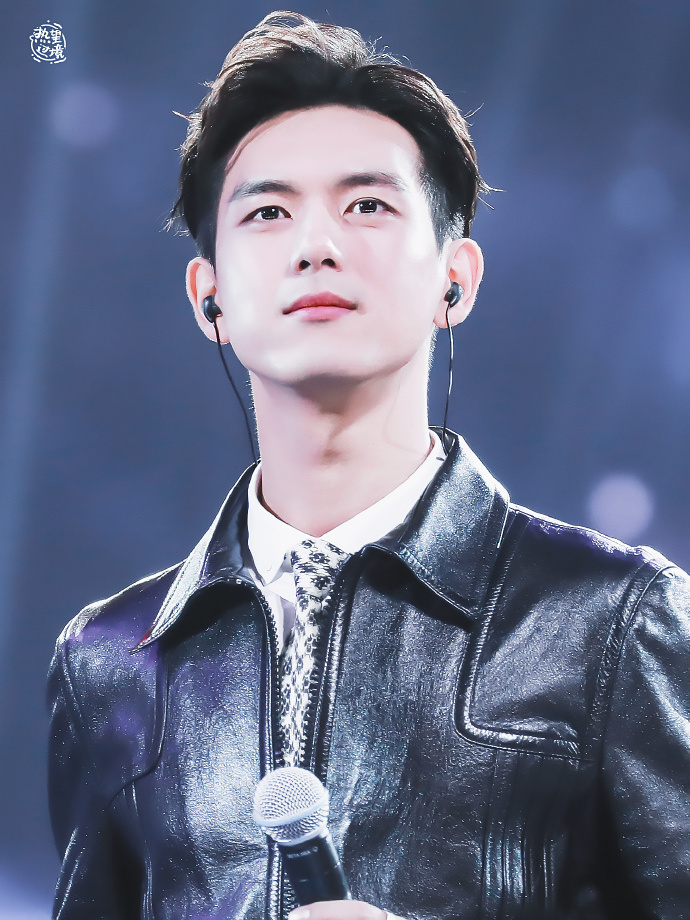
Li Xian in 2020

Li Xian (Chinese: 李现; born 19 October 1991) is a Chinese actor. He has starred in many commercial films, variety shows and music videos.

== Commercial film ==
Year	English title	Chinese title	Role	Notes/Ref.
2013	12 Years, we see it first	12年，我们一如初见	Lin Xiaofeng	The movie is player-centric, combining the changes in the emotional mindset of the two players in the 12 years and the development of 17173 to perform a touching love song related to youth. And from the movie, we also see the development and changes of the entire game industry. It can be said that "12 Years" is not only a player's youth history, but also a micro-chronology of the Chinese game industry.
2013	Confess	表白	Li Qiao	The film tells the story of childhood friends "Sheng Li" and "Li Qiao" for fifteen years. Fifteen years of time is enough to allow emotions to settle. Some people come and go, and some are still around. We sigh for all the loss and changes in time, and we are grateful for every waiting with happiness.
2016	Interstellar Gift	星际礼物	Wang Qi	The film tells the story of astronaut Wang Qi played by Li Xian in 2025 driving the spacecraft to the Kemirer galaxy, separated from his girlfriend Siyu on the planet
2018	Explore Melbourne with Li Xian	墨尔本 我本特立独行		Promotional film for Visit Victoria Campaign Launch Event
2019	Levi's			
2020	Acqua di Parma			Acqua di Parma CF
2020	HONOR	The beauty of light and shadow, a moment of love-Glory 30 series	光影之美，一瞬倾心——荣耀30系列	Honor P30 Pro
2020	JD.com			520 edition
2020	Gemice	揭秘李现的上头冰淇淋		Gemice CF
2020	Somehow I Like You	茉茗我就喜欢你		Kang Shifu (Master Kong) Jasmine Tea Chinese Valentine's Day edition.

== Variety show ==
Year	English title	Chinese title	Broadcaster	Notes/Ref.
2017	The Theory of Relativity	生活相对论	Beijing Satelit TV	Main cast

== Music video ==
Year	English title	Chinese title	Singer	Notes/Ref.
2013	"Singing When We Are Young"	初恋未满	Zhang Hanyun & Cao Xuanbin	Footage of the scene from the movie with the same name.
2015	"I Am Jiang Xiaobai"	我是江小白	Zhang Qi	In the MV, the "urban white-collar" Xiao Xianrou (Li Xian) bravely breaks through the shackles of reality, rides a locomotive to carry love, and pursues a simple and free life
2015	"Medals"	勋章	Lu Han	The MV tells 7 life stories of a bystander's perspective, where Li Xian featured as a lonely boxer.
2019	"A Nameless Generation"	无名之辈	Chen Xueran	Li as Han Shan Yang on "Go Go Squid!"
2019	"Milk and Bread"	牛奶面包	Yang Zi	Li as Han Shan Yang on "Go Go Squid!"
2019	"For Future"	給未來	Li Xian	Li as Han Shan Yang on "Go Go Squid!"
2019	"A Glorious Future"	前程似锦	Li Xian feat Chen Linong	Li as Bao Shishan on Red Fox Scholar
2020	"Wuhan How Are You"	武汉，你好吗	Chang Shilei, Doudou and Zhu Yilong	Li with 50 other celebrities; some of them the biggest names in China, Hong Kong, and Taiwan, such as Donnie Yen, Li Bingbing, Zhao Wei, Zhou Xun, Alan Tam, Jackie Chan, Nicholas Tse, and Jay Chou voiced their support for frontline medical workers. Footage of the stars are interspersed with heart-rending clips of medical personnel working courageously and tirelessly through the outbreak.
