= Hiroshi Abe's home page =

Japanese website

abehiroshi.la.coocan.jp
- Screenshot of the website in September 2025
- Website type: Personal website
- Available in: Japanese
- Headquarters: Japan
- Owner: Hiroshi Abe
- Website: abehiroshi.la.coocan.jp
- IPv6 support: Yes
- Advertising: No
- Registration: No

Hiroshi Abe's home page (Japanese: 阿部寛のホームページ, Hepburn: Abe Hiroshi no Hōmupēji) is a website by the Japanese actor Hiroshi Abe. It is known in Japan for its simple design and is often said to be reminiscent of the 1990s internet in Japan. It is also used by fans for benchmarking newly released video game consoles and hardware devices.

== History ==
The website was first created by a fan of the Japanese actor Hiroshi Abe as a fan site alongside actress Yūko Natori. Abe's agency later acquired it and made it his official website. It was hosted in Nifty Corporation's "@homepage" service. It became a viral phenomenon in 2016, when Nifty planned to discontinue their "@homepage" service, and fans feared that it would destroy the website. Nifty discontinued the website in 2016 and it was replaced with LaCoocan. On August 27, 2025, Nifty announced that it will now support HTTPS on their homepage, which was implemented in October 2025.

== Design and feature ==
The website uses both IPv4 communication and IPv6 communication under the address 2001:258:8609:73:210:131:2:8. It is one of the few websites in Japan that uses IPv6.

The home page wallpaper is covered by the words "ABE Hiroshi" while the page detailing Abe's film appearances has wallpaper covered with the word "Movie". Oricon described the colors and fonts in the content menu as "being somewhat old". The website also featured a younger photo of Abe, which was changed in 2019.

== Reception ==
The website was described by many fans for its simple design, fast loading speed, and design that was reminiscent of the 1990s internet. In a 2024 survey conducted by the website provider Nexer, the website ranked first on the "famous people's homepages that have left an impression on them". The website was described by Kontake of Netorabo as the "lightest celebrity website". Matt Schley of Otaku Magazine praised the website's simple design and said that it is his "new favorite website".

It became an internet meme in Japan to test and try to open the website on newly released gadgets such as video game consoles and hardware as a form of benchmarking, as well as opening the website on devices with low specifications, such as the Nintendo 3DS and Advanced W-ZERO3 [es], which is a Japanese smartphone developed by Sharp sold in 2007 and runs on Windows Mobile 6 Classic. It also become an internet challenge to open the site on apps and games.

The official website of the drama Kekkon Dekinai Otoko paid tribute to Abe's website by styling his character profile to look like his website, while all the other actors had generic profiles.

== See also ==
- "Bad Apple!!" - A music video used for graphics and audio tests
- Carl Johnson - Grand Theft Auto character whose model has been ported to various different video games
- Doom (List of Doom ports)
- But can it run Crysis?
- Will Smith eating spaghetti test - benchmarking AI videos
