= Cristóbal Valenzuela =

Chilean technologist

Cristóbal Valenzuela Barrera
- Valenzuela in 2025
- Born: 1989 (age 36–37)
- Education: Adolfo Ibáñez University
- Known for: RunwayML

Cristóbal Valenzuela (born 1989) is a Chilean-born technologist, software developer, and CEO of Runway. In 2018, Valenzuela co-founded the AI research company Runway in New York City with Anastasis Germanidis and Alejandro Matamala.

== Education ==
Valenzuela graduated from Adolfo Ibáñez University (AIU), a research private university in Chile. From there, Valenzuela obtained a bachelor's degree in economics and business management, along with a master's degree in arts in design in 2012. In 2018, he graduated with a media arts degree from ITP NYU's Tisch School of the Arts.

== Career and recognition ==
One of Valenzuela's first jobs was as a teaching and research assistant at the Adolfo Ibáñez University School of Design, and later an adjunct professor in the same department. In 2018, he became a researcher at NYU's Tisch School of the Arts ITP program, where he worked with Daniel Shiffman. He contributes to open-source software projects, including ml5.js, an open-source machine learning software.

He co-founded Runway with two colleagues from ITP, Anastasis Germanidis, and Alejandro Matamala. The goal of Runway is to create new tools for human imagination using generative AI.

In recent years, Valenzuela's work has been sponsored by Google and the Processing Foundation and his projects have been exhibited throughout Latin America and the US, including the Santiago Museum of Contemporary Art, Lollapalooza, NYC Media Lab, New Latin Wave, Inter-American Development Bank, Stanford University and New York University.

In September 2023, Valenzuela was named as one of the TIME 100 Most Influential People in AI (TIME100 AI).
