= LTX (world model) =

Generative artificial intelligence model

- Developer: Lightricks
- Release: November 2024
- Operating system: Cross-platform
- Type: Text-to-video, image-to-video, and audio-video generative AI model family, video-to-video, world model
- Website: https://ltx.io

LTX is a family of generative artificial intelligence video models, developed by Lightricks.

== History ==
Lightricks first released LTX in November 2024 as a text-to-video model. It contained 2-billion parameters, and is made available as open source software.

The model gained the ability to generate videos longer than 60 seconds in July 2025.

LTX-2 was announced in October 2025, and is capable of generating videos at 4K resolution or up to 50 frames per second.

Google highlighted the fact that LTX-2 was trained on its infrastructure, and saying it was "The first open source AI video generation model, powered by Google Cloud".

Upon its release it was ranked in the top-3 models for image-to-video creation by Artificial Analysis, behind Kling 3.5 by Kling AI and Veo 3.1 by Google. Its text-to-image option was ranked 7th.

In addition to its open-source release, Lightricks offers API access to LTX-2, allowing developers to generate videos from text and image prompts through a hosted service without running the model locally.

=== Open source release (2026) ===
In January 2026, Lightricks officially released the full open-source version of LTX-2, making the model’s complete codebase, weights, and associated tooling publicly available.

In March 2026 the company released LTX-2.3, which was accompanied by a desktop video editor enabling the entire model to run locally on consumer hardware.

In August 2026 LTX-2.5 was released, highlighted by its move towards world models used for robotics training, and the ability to generate 10 second videos in under 7 seconds. LTX-2.5 reported to add native multishot generation and a pretrained checkpoint intended for domain-specific fine-tuning. The release continued LTX's development as a world model, with applications including robotics and physical AI.

== Technical features ==
=== Advancements over LTX Video ===
LTX-2 builds upon the LTX Video architecture with several major improvements:

- Unified audio-video generation producing synchronized dialogue, ambience, and motion
- Native 4K rendering
- 50-fps output for cinematic motion
- Three operational modes (Fast, Pro, Ultra)
- More efficient diffusion pipelines enabling high fidelity on consumer GPUs

=== Core capabilities ===
- Text-to-video generation
- Image-to-video generation
- Video-to-video generation and video conditioning
- Multimodal audiovisual synthesis
- High-resolution spatial and temporal coherence
- Configurable quality/performance settings
- Open-source distribution of weights and datasets
- Native multishot generation
- HDR and OpenEXR input and output workflows
- Diffusion-based video decoding
- Custom Gemma 4 12B text encoder
- Pretrained LTX-2.5 checkpoint for domain-specific fine-tuning

== Reception ==
Initial reception to LTX-2 was broadly positive, with several technology and media outlets highlighting its open-source approach and multimodal capabilities. Open Source For You described LTX-2 as “one of the first AI video systems to combine 4K output, synchronized audio, and an open model release,” noting that it positioned Lightricks as a significant competitor to proprietary systems such as OpenAI's Sora and Google's Veo.

IEA Green said that the model “could rewrite the AI filmmaking game,” emphasizing that its 50-fps rendering and unified audio-video generation made it suitable for professional studios and independent creators alike.

AI News characterized LTX-2 as a “major step forward in the democratization of cinematic-quality video generation,” praising its consumer-grade hardware efficiency and multi-tier generation modes, while also noting ongoing challenges in long-form temporal stability.

FinancialContent reported strong interest among creative agencies, attributing the attention to Lightricks’ decision to release model weights and datasets, which reviewers said enabled “a level of transparency not typically seen in commercial AI video models.”

=== Benchmarks and rankings ===
Upon release, LTX-2 ranked third for image-to-video creation in the Artificial Analysis benchmark, behind Kling 3.5 and Veo 3.1, while its text-to-video option ranked seventh. As of early 2026, it was the highest-ranked open-source model in the benchmark.

=== Limitations ===
Some early reviewers also pointed out quality limitations. The Ray3 technical review noted occasional inconsistencies in lip-sync and motion tracking during long scenes, though it stated these were “in line with the challenges faced by all current AI video diffusion models” and expected to improve with continued iteration.

Like other diffusion-based video generators, LTX-2 can produce artifacts in complex multi-person scenes and may struggle with precise text rendering within generated video.

== See also ==
- Sora (text-to-video model)
- Veo (text-to-video model)
- Generative artificial intelligence
- Kling (text-to-video model)
- Runway (company)
- Diffusion model
- World model (artificial intelligence)
