= Aespa's Synk Road =

2022–2023 South Korean reality web series

- Main poster
- Hangul: 에스파의 싱크로드
- RR: Eseupaui singkeurodeu
- MR: Esŭp'aŭi singk'ŭrodŭ
- Genre: Reality show
- Directed by: Jin Sun-mi
- Starring: Aespa
- Country of origin: South Korea
- Original language: Korean
- No. of episodes: 12

Production
- Production company: SM C&C Studio

Original release
- Network: Wavve
- Release: December 28, 2022 – February 1, 2023

Aespa's Synk Road (Korean: 에스파의 싱크로드; stylized as aespa's Synk Road) is a South Korean reality web series starring Aespa. Produced by SM C&C Studio and directed by Jin Sun-mi, the reality show was broadcast on Wavve on December 28, 2022, and was shown every Wednesday. It is a variety travel show where the members complete missions to acquire "ae-key" cards hidden along their travel route, featuring activities like teamwork and secret missions and showcasing their adventures over three days and two nights.

== Production and synopsis ==
On November 25, 2022, it was reported that Aespa would have their first reality show along with the release of a concept poster that shows the members against the backdrop of a road and a key. In addition, a poster of them enjoying car camping against the backdrop of the night sky full of stars has been released. The reality web series was produced by SM C&C Studio and was directed by Jin Sun-mi. SM C&C stated that the group will have their first solo reality show as a Wavve Original, titled Aespa's Synk Road, and added that one would be able to catch a glimpse of the group's "new" side as it was their first reality show. It was scheduled to be released every Wednesday at 11:00 AM KST (UTC+09:00) starting December 14 through Wavve initially, before moving its broadcast to December 28. Additionally, the main teaser of the show was released on December 7 ahead of its first broadcast premiere on Wavve. On 8:00 PM of January 3, 2024, a special live broadcast of the show was scheduled wherein they will talk about the story of their first reality show filming, question and answer portion, and playing a mini-game.

The show was done in a real-life set, rather than on a stage decorated with metaverse, notably the worldview of Kwangya. The filming took place at a resort located in Donghae and Pyeongchang in the province of Gangwon. Aespa's Synk Road is a variety travel show where members must complete "Synk Road" by acquiring "ae-key" cards hidden throughout the travel road. The activities to obtain the "ae-key" card will include working together to devise a plan to succeed in a mission and secretly carrying out a mission alone without the members knowing. Aespa would spend three days and two nights on their travel story as it contained the "quirky" and "lively" first reality of the four members. It will also show the members doing "thrilling" activities, healing time in nature, and mukbang of all sorts of delicacies.

== Episodes ==
No.	Title	Original release date
1	"aespa's Synk Road Episode 1"	December 28, 2022
In the first episode, the members of Aespa venture on their first reality show journey to Gangwon-do. The episode features the group's participation in car games introduced by Super Junior's Shindong via VCR, leading to a "friendly" competition. At a restaurant, the members enjoy local Gangwon-do delicacies and display their clear awareness of reality show norms by questioning the production staff. The episode concludes with the group receiving a mysterious invitation to locate the ae-key and complete the Synk Road, initiating their first mission.
2	"aespa's Synk Road Episode 2"	December 28, 2022
The title of the show is announced and Aespa received the mission they must finish during the trip.
3	"aespa's Synk Road Episode 3"	January 4, 2023
Aespa successfully obtains their first ae-key during the sky glider mission, then takes on the zipline challenge. The group then visits Chuam Beach in Donghae, renowned for its Candlestick Rock. Here, they express admiration for the scenery, capturing numerous photos while "humorously" teasing a member who struggles with photography. Amidst enjoying the autumn sea, a new ae-key mission appears, prompting the members to sprint across the sandy beach and dig the ground.
4	"aespa's Synk Road Episode 4"	January 4, 2023
The members of Aespa participated in a three-course dinner game featuring fresh seafood from Gangwon-do. They compete in games such as linking four letters and a character quiz.
5	"aespa's Synk Road Episode 5"	January 11, 2023
The episode featured the conclusion of the three-course dinner game and revealed the first lodging for the Gangwon-do trip. Aespa then played the Initial Consonant Compliment Quiz which would help them secure their dinner. They then visited a convenience store for late-night snacks and breakfast supplies for which Karina and Winter checked the ingredients, while Giselle and Ningning indulged in an ice cream spree. However, the group faced a budget crisis at the checkout counter as they thought of whether they would surrender to the temptation of an advance payment on the first day.
6	"aespa's Synk Road Episode 6"	January 11, 2022
Upon arriving at their accommodation, Aespa members are amazed by the ocean view from the wide terrace overlooking Mangsang Beach. A room assignment game follows, with each member competing for a single room of their choice. The playground in front of the dorm presents the "most terrifying" missions yet, with the "spooky" atmosphere causing screams and panic among the members.
7	"aespa's Synk Road Episode 7"	January 18, 2023
Aespa left Donghae and then enjoyed their trip to Pyeongchang. On the second day of their trip, the members gather in one room in the morning to chat and reveal their daily lives, such as staying under the blankets. The members took on each role and prepared breakfast right after waking up, still in their pajamas. They then arrived at an alpaca ranch, the first travel destination for the second day of Synk Road. They rode up the monorail that continues along the mountain path. While walking around the ranch and enjoying the fall foliage, the members met various animals with which they fed, took pictures, and spent time. After finishing all the sightseeing, they were given an individual quiz mission to which the ae-key was at stake.
8	"aespa's Synk Road Episode 8"	January 18, 2023
After enjoying Pyeongchang beef for lunch, Aespa headed to the stargazing spot Yukbaekmajigi. The members arrived at the peak, along the winding road, and kept clicking the shutter of the photo spa in front of them at the beautiful scenery. The members then sat in a circle, sang along, and enjoyed a break in nature by looking at the stars in the sky. They also played a game tailored to the stargazing spot with a set of three snacks at stake.
9	"aespa's Synk Road Episode 9"	January 25, 2023
The episode revealed Aespa's last night of their first reality show. The members changed into comfortable clothes and enjoyed teatime while eating small late-night snacks and freely talking about the most memorable places from the trip. Next, the members were called one by one to the unidentified mission room and were given a secret mission overnight with an ae-key. After receiving the mission, Karina becomes the "forbidden person" who prohibits all actions of the members, and Ningning becomes the "mission slicker."
10	"aespa's Synk Road Episode 10"	January 25, 2023
Aespa visited a buckwheat restaurant in Bongpyeong for their last day while enjoying a buckwheat meal, including delicious buckwheat noodles, boiled pork, and assorted buckwheat. At the end of their meal, the results of the Secret Mission Overnight was revealed.
11	"aespa's Synk Road Episode 11"	February 1, 2023
Aespa held an ae-key search race at the final mission location. They needed at least seven more ae-keys to complete the final Synk Road mission. The members left for the final location of the trip, Hyoseok Moonlight Hill, to find the hidden ae-keys. In the treasure hunt race where they have to find ae-keys hidden all over the hill, a special rule was revealed where the member who collects the most ae-keys will be given a huge benefit.
12	"aespa's Synk Road Episode 12"	February 1, 2023
Photo Man game was held, where members had to take pictures of other members' eyes, noses, and mouths with an instant camera along with the ae-key finding mission. In addition, legendary photos that had to be burned during the game were made. After the missions of running, hiding, alliances, and betrayals are over, the members gather together again to check the results. As they wrapped up their show at a cafe, they talked about what they wanted to do on their next trip. The members also expressed their gratitude to the production staff for their hard work and expressed their affection for their first reality show.

== Release and reception ==
On June 19, 2024, it was announced that Aespa's Synk Road will be released on DVD. Upon its release, it peaked at number six and charted on the Oricon DVD Chart for three weeks.
