= Google Flow =

Generative artificial intelligence filmmaking platform by Google

- Other names: Flow (2025–2026)
- Developer: Google
- Release: May 20, 2025; 17 months ago
- Operating system: Web application
- Platform: Web
- Type: Generative artificial intelligence
- License: Proprietary
- Website: labs.google/flow

Google Flow, formerly known as Flow, is a generative AI video and multimedia creation tool developed by Google. Introduced in 2025, Flow allows users to generate videos, music, and visual images using natural language prompts and uploaded media. It uses Veo, a text-to-video model, and Imagen, a text-to-image model, and is available through the Google Labs platform.

== History ==
Google unveiled Flow during the annual Google I/O keynote in May 2025. The product was developed by teams within Google Labs and Google DeepMind as part of Google's broader push into generative media systems.

Flow combined capabilities previously spread across separate Google experimental tools, including VideoFX for AI video generation, and ImageFX and Whisk for AI image generation. At launch, Flow focused primarily on video generation via the Veo and Imagen models.

By August 2025, Google said that users had generated more than 100 million videos through Flow.

At the following year's I/O keynote, Flow was rebranded as Google Flow, along with the announcement of Google Flow Music.

== Features ==
Flow allows users to create AI-generated media using text prompts or preexisting reference images, including generated images.

Flow includes the ability to use AI to generate video. Users can generate short scenes and clips using natural language descriptions. The system's text-to-video model is Google Veo.

For text-to-image, Flow uses Google's Imagen and Nano Banana.

Later versions of Flow added synchronized sound generation and ambient audio features. Veo 3.1 enabled generation of dialogue, environmental effects, and music in conjunction with video clips.

In May 2025, Google introduced Flow TV as a platform for users to browse AI-generated clips and read the prompts used to create them.

== Google Flow Music ==
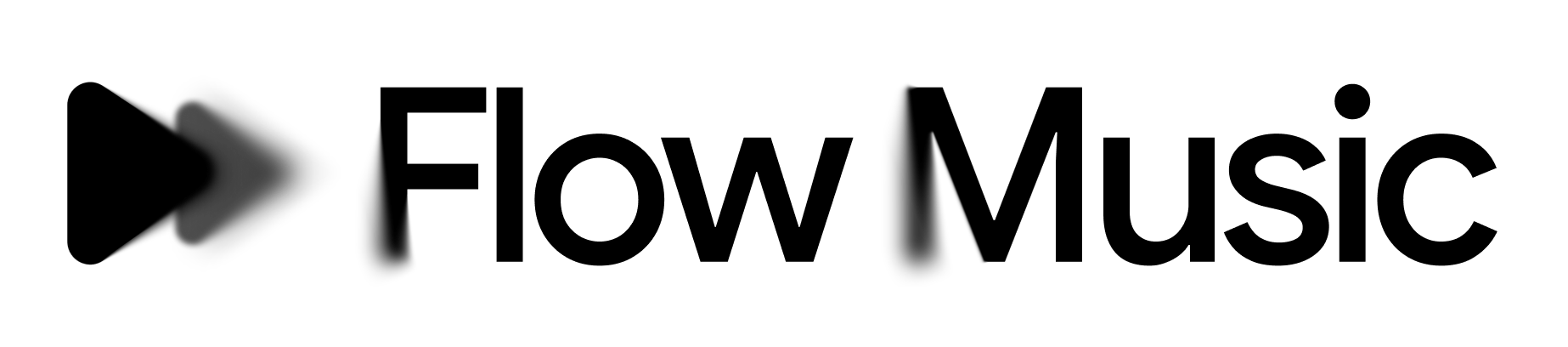
Logo used after February 2026

Google Flow Music (formerly ProducerAI) is an AI music generation platform associated with the Flow name. It originated as ProducerAI before being acquired by Google on February 2026. The service uses Google's Lyria audio generation models to generate songs, playlists, and remixable musical compositions from text prompts.

In 2026, Google partnered with music distribution company Believe and its subsidiary TuneCore to expand access to Flow Music for musicians and producers. In July 2026, Google announced that their previous experiments, MusicFX and MusicFX DJ, would be removed for Google Flow Music as its replacement.

== Legal issues ==
In 2026, software company Autodesk filed a trademark infringement lawsuit against Google over the use of the name "Flow". Autodesk argued that the branding could create confusion with its existing Flow production-management products. Reuters later reported that Autodesk sought damages and restrictions on Google's use of the Flow trademark.

== See also ==
- Google DeepMind
- Gemini (language model)
- Generative artificial intelligence
- Text-to-video model
- Artificial intelligence art
- Google Labs
