= Colossyan =

Technology company

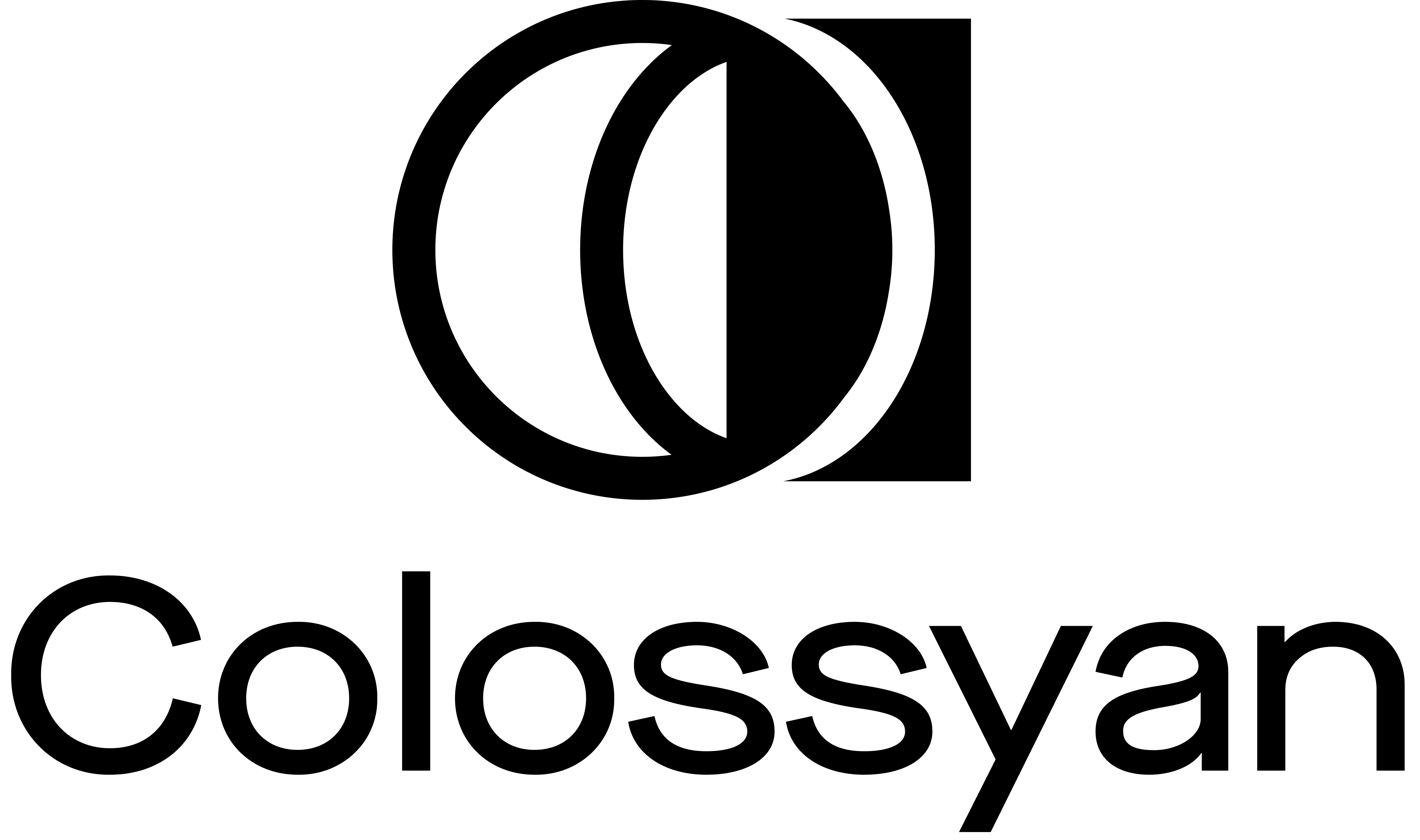
- Type: Private
- Industry: Technology
- Founded: 2020; 6 years ago
- Founder: Zoltan Kovacs; Kristof Szabo; Dominik Mate Kovacs
- Headquarters: New York, London, Budapest
- Key people: Dominik Mate Kovacs (CEO)
- Website: www.colossyan.com

Colossyan is a technology company that uses generative artificial intelligence (GenAI) to create corporate training videos.

== Background ==
Colossyan was established in Denmark in 2020 by Zoltan Kovacs, Kristof Szabo, and Dominik Mate Kovacs, previously involved with the deepfakes detection platform Defudger. The company launched its video generation platform in early 2021.

The AI video platform allows companies to create training videos by utilizing text-to-speech technology for human-like AI avatars that deliver material with realistic lip syncing. Users input scripts, which the TTS engine, supporting over 70 languages, reads aloud, facilitating the production of multilingual content. The platform includes various AI avatars, voices, and customizable backdrops, and allows the incorporation of multiple-choice quizzes to assess viewer understanding and engagement. The conversation mode enables creating scenarios where multiple avatars interact. Colossyan is used by Hewlett Packard, BASF, BMW, Novartis, Porsche, Vodafone, Paramount, and other companies, including the State of New Mexico, which uses the platform to create educational video modules for residents.

=== Funding ===
In July 2021, the company secured €1 million in seed funding. Investors included Day One Capital, Oktogon Ventures, the early-stage VC fund APX, which is backed by Axel Springer and Porsche, as well as angel investors Mikal Hallstrup and Akos Kapui.

In 2023, the company secured $5 million in Series A round. The round was led by Bulgarian Launchub Ventures and backed by UK L&D specialist Emerge Education together with the participation of previous round's investors Day One Capital, Oktogon Ventures, and APX.

In February 2024, Colossyan raised $22 million in a funding round led by Lakestar, with additional participation from Launchub, Day One Capital, and Emerge Education.
