= Matthias Niessner =

German computer scientist (born 1986)

Matthias Nießner
- Born: Gunzenhausen
- Citizenship: German
- Education: University of Erlangen-Nuremberg (2013)
- Scientific career
- Fields: Computer Graphics, Computer Vision
- Workplaces: Technical University of Munich (professor)
- Thesis: Rendering Subdivision Surfaces using Hardware Tessellation (2013)
- Doctoral advisor: Günther Greiner
- Website: www.niessnerlab.org

Matthias Nießner (born 1986) is a German computer scientist, academic, and entrepreneur working in the fields of computer graphics and computer vision. He is a professor of Computer Science at the Technical University of Munich and leads the Visual Computing Lab. As a member of the Max Planck Center for Visual Computing and Communication Junior Research Group Program, he was a Visiting assistant professor at Stanford University, working in the lab of Pat Hanrahan.

== Education ==
Nießner received a Ph.D. in computer graphics from the University of Erlangen-Nuremberg in 2013 and received his Diploma degree in 2010. His thesis on the topic of Subdivision Surface Rendering using Hardware Tessellation was submitted in 2013 and was awarded the highest honors. Some ideas from this thesis were used in the most recent version of Pixar's OpenSubdiv, which also incorporates ideas dating back to 1996 from Edwin Catmull, Tony DeRose, Michael Kass, Charles Loop, and Peter Schröder.

== Career ==
Through a junior research group program, Nießner was a Visiting assistant professor from 2013 to 2017 at Stanford University in the lab of Pat Hanrahan. Since 2017, he has been a professor at the Technical University of Munich, where he heads the Visual Computing Lab.

Nießner's work focuses on 3D reconstruction and semantic scene understanding. Among his best-known work is that on facial reenactment, which has been widely criticized for contributing to the ease with which fake news can be generated. The majority of the external stake in his company Synthesia comes from speculative American businessman Mark Cuban. He developed with his colleagues Face2Face, which was the first work to manipulate facial expressions from consumer cameras in real time. More recently, he has been working on 3D semantic scene understanding, developing with his colleagues ScanNet, the first large-scale, densely-annotated 3D dataset.

Nießner was awarded a Google Faculty Research Award in 2017 for Photo-realistic Avatars from Videos: Free Viewpoint Animation of Human Faces, as well as a Rudolf Mössbauer Fellowship from the Technical University of Munich.
