= Lourdes Agapito =

German computer scientist

Lourdes Agapito FREng
- Scientific career
- Workplaces: University College London; Queen Mary University of London
- Thesis: Estrategias de correspondencia jerárquica y métodos directos de autocalibración para un sistema estereoscópico binocular (1996)
- Doctoral advisor: María Teresa de Pedro Lucio
- Website: www0.cs.ucl.ac.uk/staff/L.Agapito/

Lourdes de Agapito Vicente FREng is a British computer scientist and academic. She is Professor of 3D Vision in the department of computer science at University College London (UCL), where she leads a research group with a focus on 3D dynamic scene understanding from video. Agapito is the co-founder of the software company Synthesia, and an elected member of the Executive Committee of the British Machine Vision Association.

== Education and career ==
Agapito received her Ph.D. in computer science from the Universidad Complutense de Madrid, Spain in 1996.

Agapito was a postdoctoral fellow in the Active Vision Lab in the Robotics Research Group at the University of Oxford from 1997 to 2000. She was awarded an EU Marie Curie Postdoctoral Research Fellowship between 1997 and 1999.

In 2001, Agapito became a lecturer at Queen Mary University of London. She became a senior lecturer in 2007 and a reader in computer vision in 2011. In 2008, she received an ERC Starting Independent Researcher Grant for the HUMANIS (Human Motion Analysis from Image Sequences) project. In 2013, she joined the Computer Science Department at University College London.

In 2017, Agapito co-founded the software company Synthesia which offers content creation tools that include video synthesis.

Agapito is an elected member of the Executive Committee of the British Machine Vision Association, a member of the Vision and Imaging Science group and the Centre for Inverse Problems.

In 2026 she was elected a Fellow of the Royal Academy of Engineering.

== Research ==
Agapito's major research interests are in computer vision. In particular, her research focusses on inferring 3D information from videos recorded from a single moving camera. Agapito's early research focused on static scenes (structure from motion) but moved on to the challenging problem of estimating the 3D shape of moving non-rigid objects ("non-rigid structure from motion"). She has published numerous works on non-rigid structure from motion for deformable tracking, dense optical flow estimation, non-rigid video registration, 3D reconstruction of deformable and articulated structure, and dense 3D modelling of non-rigid dynamic scenes.

== Selected awards ==
- 1997–1999: EU Marie Curie Postdoctoral Research Fellowship
- 2008–2014: European Research Council Starting Independent Researcher Grant
- 2014 Area Chair for CVPR European Conference on Computer Vision (ECCV), and Asian Conference on Computer Vision (ACCV). Workshops Chair for ECCV
- 2016 Programme Chair for the Conference on Computer Vision and Pattern Recognition (CVPR)
- 2020 Programme Chair for the British Machine Vision Conference
