= Veo (text-to-video model) =

Video-generating machine learning model

- A video generated by Veo 3 of an owl and badger
- Developer: Google DeepMind
- Release: May 2024; 2 years ago
- Stable release: Veo 3.1 / 15 October 2025; 13 months ago
- Type: Text-to-video model
- Website: deepmind.google/models/veo/

Veo, or Google Veo, is a text-to-video model developed by Google DeepMind and announced in May 2024. As a generative AI model, it creates videos based on user prompts. Veo 3, released in May 2025, can also generate accompanying audio.

== Development ==
In May 2024, a multimodal video generation model called Veo was announced at Google I/O 2024. Google claimed that it could generate 1080p videos over a minute long. In December 2024, Google released Veo 2, available via VideoFX. It supports 4K resolution video generation and has an improved understanding of physics. In April 2025, Google announced that Veo 2 became available for advanced users on the Gemini app.

In May 2025, Google released Veo 3, which not only generates videos but also creates synchronized audio — including dialogue, sound effects, and ambient noise — to match the visuals. Google also announced Flow, a video-creation tool powered by Veo and Imagen. Google DeepMind CEO Demis Hassabis described the release as the moment when AI video generation left the era of the silent film. This was rebranded as Google Flow at the 2026 Google I/O keynote, along with the announcement of Google Flow Music.

== Capabilities ==
An LGBTQ romantic thriller short film, generated by Google Veo 3. This video is an example of detailed, diverse, realistic character models; continuity with characters and environments between cuts; music; voice acting; subtitles; and product placement.

Google Veo can be purchased at multiple subscription tiers and through Google "AI credits". The software itself can be run by two different consoles, Google Gemini and Google Flow. Gemini is geared towards shorter, quicker, and faster projects, using the Gemini AI chat model, while Google Flow, which is essentially a movie editor, allows users to create longer projects with continuity, using the same characters and actors. Users can create a maximum of eight seconds per clip.

According to Gizmodo Veo 3 users were directing the model to generate low-quality content, such as man on the street interviews or haul videos of people unboxing products. 404 Media reported that the tool tended to repeat the same joke in response to different prompts.

Commentators speculated that Google had trained the service on YouTube videos or Reddit posts. Google itself had not stated the source of its training content.

In July 2025, Media Matters for America reported that racist and antisemitic videos generated using Veo 3 were being uploaded to TikTok. Ryan Whitwam of Ars Technica commented, "In a perfect world, Veo 3 would refuse to create these videos, but vagueness in the prompt and the AI's inability to understand the subtleties of racist tropes (i.e., the use of monkeys instead of humans in some videos) make it easy to skirt the rules."

== See also ==
- Sora (text-to-video model)
- Seedance
- VideoPoet – Text-to-video model by Google
- Dream Machine (text-to-video model)
- LTX (AI Model)
