= Kling AI =

Chinese text-to-video model

- Developer: Kuaishou
- Release: June 10, 2024; 2 years ago (beta)
- Stable release: 4.0 / October 2026; 0 months ago
- Type: Text-to-video model
- Website: kling.ai (International) klingai.com (China)

Kling AI is a generative artificial intelligence service created and hosted by the Beijing-based technology company Kuaishou. Kling generates videos from natural language descriptions, called prompts.

== History ==
Kling AI was developed by Kuaishou, a Chinese technology company founded in 2011 that operates a popular short video platform. Kuaishou launched the first version of Kling AI in June 2024, making it available for public testing within its video editing app, KuaiYing.

In December 2024, Kuaishou released Kling 1.6, which featured improved video generation capabilities. This was followed by Kling 2.0 in April 2025, and Kling 2.1 in May 2025, which introduced different quality modes for users. On June 5, 2025, celebrating its first anniversary, Kling launched a referral program.

Following the launch of version 3.0 in early 2026, Kuaishou introduced an early-access preview build named "Kling 4.0 Flash" for top-tier annual subscribers on September 28, 2026. The full flagship Kling 4.0 model was officially launched globally in October 2026. This major update introduced native 30-second video generation, native 4K Ultra-HD resolution with 10-bit HDR output, two-channel stereo audio generation, and expanded keyframe editing support.

== Technology ==
Kling AI uses a diffusion-based transformer architecture (DiT), which has been enhanced by Kuaishou with a self-developed 3D variational autoencoder (VAE) network. This 3D VAE network allows for synchronous spatiotemporal compression, which helps to improve the quality of the generated videos while maintaining training efficiency.

The model also features a computationally efficient, full-attention mechanism that serves as a spatiotemporal modeling module. This allows Kling AI to accurately capture complex motion and details in videos, including fast-moving objects and drastic scene changes.

== Reception ==
Kling AI's content moderation policies have faced criticism. The model operates under strict censorship rules that align with Chinese government regulations, preventing the generation of content related to sensitive topics such as politics, protests, or criticism of the government.

Furthermore, the popularity of Kling AI has attracted malicious actors. In May 2025, a malware campaign was discovered that used fake Kling AI websites and advertisements to distribute infostealer malware to unsuspecting users.
