= Seedance =

Text-to-video model developed by ByteDance

- Developer: ByteDance
- Release: June 2025; 1 year ago
- Stable release: Seedance 2.5; July 31, 2026; 2 months ago
- Type: Text-to-video model
- Website: seed.bytedance.com/en/seedance2_5

Seedance is an AI text-to-video model created by ByteDance launched in 2025. Seedance 2.0 quickly went viral for its ability to create short video clips featuring photorealistic scenes of famous actors and characters. Its level of realism caused fascination, particularly in China, but also led to concerns about widespread copyright infringement, potential misuse in spreading disinformation and career impact on human performers due to its ability to replicate Hollywood-style film production.

== History ==
Seedance was first released in June 2025. Seedance 2.0 was released in February 2026. Shortly after it was released, realistic clips based on real actors, TV shows and films went viral across the Internet. Clips included Friends characters reimagined as otters, a fight between Brad Pitt and Tom Cruise, and Will Smith engaged in battle with a red-eyed spaghetti monster in reference to the Will Smith eating spaghetti test.

After viewing the clip of the fight between Pitt and Cruise that went viral, Rhett Reese, co-writer of Deadpool & Wolverine and Zombieland announced that on social media "I hate to say it. It's likely over for us," further stating that "In next to no time, one person is going to be able to sit at a computer and create a movie indistinguishable from what Hollywood now releases." After seeing the Pitt/Cruise fight scene, software developer and creative professional Aron Peterson questioned if the scene was purely AI generated or if Bytedance was using a video-to-video workflow behind the scenes; Seedance's website provided several examples of reference videos, including a fight that was shot with stuntmen against a green screen backdrop.

Seedance was denounced by the Motion Picture Association for copyright infringement quickly after release. On February 13, 2026, The Walt Disney Company sent ByteDance a cease and desist letter alleging that the model had been trained with Disney works without any compensation. Paramount Skydance accused the company of engaging in "blatant infringement" of its intellectual property including Star Trek, South Park, and Dora the Explorer. On February 16, 2026, ByteDance announced that it "respects intellectual property rights" and "heard the concerns regarding Seedance 2.0." It said it would strengthen the safeguards used to prevent the violation of intellectual property rights. On March 16, 2026, United States Senators Marsha Blackburn and Peter Welch wrote a letter to ByteDance CEO Liang Rubo asking him to shut down Seedance and implement safeguards, stating that it is "the most glaring example of copyright infringement from a ByteDance product to date, and you must immediately shut down Seedance and implement meaningful safeguards to prevent further infringing outputs."

The general public in China is generally enthusiastic about Seedance. The entertainment industry in China has reacted more positively than Hollywood to AI generally. Jia Zhangke, a Chinese film director, posted a video which remade classic scenes from his films that he said was created with ByteDance's Doubao chatbot. Writing on Weibo, he stated that "I don't worry about whether technology will replace movies," and that "What actually matters is how the technology is used by people."

In July 2026, Bytedance released Seedance 2.5, a major breakthrough for text-to-video models, now being able to generate 30 second native videos with 50 multimodal references as input. Major features also include local editing: instead of regenerating an entire 30-second clip if one detail (like a character's hair color) is incorrect, users can now modify specific areas within the scene to fix it. This prevents the loss of preferred acting performances, facial expressions, or lighting established in the original take. Seedance 2.5 also includes a beta long-video mode extending clips to 3 minutes. Seedance 2.5 is also offered through third-party API providers, including Wiro AI.

== See also ==
- Sora (text-to-video model)
- Google Veo
- LTX (text-to-video model)
- Runway Gen
