= VideoPoet =

Text-to-video model by Google

- "A dog eating popcorn at the cinema" "A teddy bear with a cap, sunglasses, and leather jacket playing drums" Example videos generated by the model from texts
- Developer: Google
- Release: February 8, 2024; 2 years ago
- Type: Large language model

VideoPoet is a large language model developed by Google Research in 2023 for video making. It can be asked to animate still images. The model accepts text, images, and videos as inputs, with a program to add feature for any input to any format generated content. VideoPoet was publicly announced on December 19, 2023. It uses an autoregressive language model.

VideoPoet received a Best Paper Award at ICML 2024.
