= Runway (company) =

American artificial intelligence company

Runway AI, Inc.
- Type: Private
- Industry: Artificial intelligence machine learning software development
- Founded: 2018; 8 years ago
- Headquarters: Manhattan, New York City, U.S.
- Area served: Worldwide
- Key people: Cristóbal Valenzuela (CEO); Anastasis Germanidis (CTO); Alejandro Matamala (CDO)
- Products: Runway Gen-4.5; Runway Aleph 2.0; Runway Act-Two; Edit Studio; Runway Dev
- Number of employees: 265
- Website: runway.com

Runway AI, Inc. (also known as Runway and RunwayML) is an American company headquartered in New York City that specializes in generative artificial intelligence research and technologies. The company is primarily focused on creating products for generating videos, images, and various multimedia content through developing commercial text-to-video and video generative AI models.

Runway's tools and AI models have been utilized in films such as Everything Everywhere All at Once, and in editing television shows like The Late Show with Stephen Colbert.

== Background and present ==
The company was founded in 2018 by the Chileans Cristóbal Valenzuela, Alejandro Matamala and the Greek Anastasis Germanidis after they met at New York University Tisch School of the Arts ITP. Runway is focused on generative AI for video, media, and art. The company develops proprietary foundational model technology used in filmmaking, post-production, advertising, editing, and visual effects. Additionally, Runway offers an iOS app aimed at consumers.

The company raised US$2 million in seed funding in 2018 to develop a platform for deploying machine learning models within multimedia applications.

In December 2020, Runway raised US$8.5 million in a Series A funding round.

In December 2021, the company raised US$35 million in a Series B funding round.

On December 21, 2022, Runway raised US$50 million in a Series C round. This was followed by a $141 million Series C extension round in June 2023 at a $1.5 billion valuation from Google, Nvidia, and Salesforce to build foundational multimodal AI models for content generation.

On 3 April 2025, Runway raised $308 million in a funding round led by General Atlantic, valuing it at over $3 billion.

In February 2026, Runway raised $315 million at a reported valuation of $5.3 billion.

=== Stable Diffusion ===
In August 2022, the company co-released an improved version of their latent diffusion model called Stable Diffusion, an open-source deep learning text-to-image model developed with the CompVis Group at LMU Munich and supported by compute from Stability AI.

== Partnerships ==
In June 2025, AMC Networks partnered with Runway for AI content creation. AMC planned to use Runway's technology to generate marketing images and help pre-visualize shows before production begins.

In September 2024, Runway announced a partnership with Lionsgate Entertainment to create a custom AI video generation model trained on the studio's proprietary catalog of over 20,000 film and television titles. The model is designed exclusively for use by Lionsgate-affiliated filmmakers, and cannot be accessed by other Runway users.

== Film festivals ==
Since 2023, Runway has hosted an annual AI Film Festival (AIFF) for films created using artificial intelligence tools. In its initial year it had 300 submissions and screenings in small New York City theaters. In 2025 it had over 6,000 submissions.

Runway has also partnered with the Tribeca Film Festival since 2024 to showcase AI-generated films.

== Recognition ==
In June 2023, Runway was selected as one of the 100 Most Influential Companies in the world by Time magazine.
