= Ashish Vaswani =

Indian computer scientist

- Born: 1980 (age 45–46); India
- Education: University of Southern California (PhD); Birla Institute of Technology, Mesra (B.Tech.)
- Known for: Transformer (deep learning architecture)
- Scientific career
- Fields: Natural Language Processing; Deep Learning; Artificial Intelligence
- Workplaces: Google Brain (2016-2021); Nvidia (2026-present)
- Thesis: Smaller, Faster, and Accurate Models for Statistical Machine Translation (2014)
- Doctoral advisor: David Chiang; Liang Huang

Ashish Vaswani is an Indian computer scientist and entrepreneur. He conducted research at Google Brain, co-founded Adept AI, and was co-founder and chief executive officer of Essential AI. As of June 2026, Vaswani, along with Essential AI, was acqui-hired by Nvidia.

Vaswani is a co-author of the 2017 paper "Attention Is All You Need", which introduced the Transformer neural network architecture. The Transformer model has been used in the development of subsequent NLP models BERT, ChatGPT, and their successors.

== Career ==
Vaswani completed his engineering in Computer Science from Birla Institute of Technology, Mesra in 2002. In 2004, he enrolled at the University of Southern California for graduate studies. He earned his PhD in Computer Science at the University of Southern California supervised by David Chiang. During his research career at Google, Vaswani was part of the Google Brain team, where he conducted the work leading to the 'Attention Is All You Need' publication. Prior to joining Google, he was affiliated with the Information Sciences Institute at the University of Southern California.

After Google, Vaswani co-founded Adept AI, a machine learning-focused startup that developed AI agents and tools for software automation. He later left the company. Vaswani co-founded Essential AI with Niki Parmar in December 2022. He was chief executive officer of Essential AI until June 2026 when Essential AI, including Vaswani, was acqui-hired by Nvidia.

== Notable works ==
Vaswani's most notable paper, "Attention Is All You Need", was published in 2017. The paper introduced the Transformer model, which uses self-attention mechanisms instead of recurrence for sequence-to-sequence tasks.

The Transformer architecture has become foundational to modern language models and NLP systems, including BERT (2018), GPT-2, GPT-3 (2019–2020) and many more recent models. The "Attention Is All You Need" paper is among the most cited papers in machine learning.
