= Quoc V. Le =

Vietnamese-American computer scientist (born 1982)

- Born: Lê Viết Quốc; 1982 (age 43–44); Hương Thủy, Thừa Thiên Huế, Vietnam
- Education: Australian National University; Stanford University
- Known for: seq2seq doc2vec Neural architecture search Google Neural Machine Translation
- Scientific career
- Fields: Machine learning
- Workplaces: Google Brain; Google DeepMind; Discovery Loop
- Thesis: Scalable feature learning (2013)
- Doctoral advisor: Andrew Ng
- Other academic advisors: Alex Smola

Lê Viết Quốc (born 1982), or in anglicized form Quoc Viet Le, is a Vietnamese-American computer scientist and artificial intelligence researcher. He is a Google Fellow at Google DeepMind and a founding member of the Google Brain project.

Le is best known for his pioneering work in deep learning, particularly in large-scale unsupervised learning, sequence-to-sequence (seq2seq) models, and AutoML (neural architecture search). His research laid the foundation for modern machine translation systems, such as Google Translate, and advanced the field of large language models (LLMs).

== Education and career ==
Le was born in Hương Thủy in the Thừa Thiên Huế province of Vietnam. He attended Quốc Học Huế High School before moving to Australia in 2004 to pursue a Bachelor’s degree at the Australian National University. During his undergraduate studies, he worked with Alex Smola on kernel method in machine learning. In 2007, Le moved to the United States to pursue graduate studies in computer science at Stanford University, where his PhD advisor was Andrew Ng.

In 2011, Le became a founding member of Google Brain along with his then advisor Andrew Ng, Google Fellow Jeff Dean, and researcher Greg Corrado. He led Google Brain’s first major breakthrough: a deep learning algorithm trained on 16,000 CPU cores, which learned to recognize cats by watching YouTube videos—without being explicitly taught the concept of a "cat."

In 2014, Le co-proposed two influential models in machine learning. Together with Ilya Sutskever, Oriol Vinyals, he introduced the seq2seq model for machine translation, a foundational technique in natural language processing. In the same year, in collaboration with Tomáš Mikolov, Le developed the doc2vec model for representation learning of documents. Le was also a key contributor of Google Neural Machine Translation system.

In 2017, Le initiated and led the AutoML project at Google Brain, pioneering the use of neural architecture search. This project significantly advanced automated machine learning. This work led to EfficientNet, a family of image recognition models that achieved state-of-the-art accuracy while being significantly smaller and faster than previous models.

In 2020, Le contributed to the development of Meena, later renamed LaMDA, a conversational large language model based on the seq2seq architecture. In 2022, Le and coauthors published chain-of-thought prompting, a method that enhances the reasoning capabilities of large language models.

In 2024, Le contributed to the development of AlphaGeometry, an AI system that solves complex geometry problems at a level approaching a human International Mathematical Olympiad (IMO) gold-medalist. The system, published in Nature, demonstrated the ability to solve 25 out of 30 Olympiad geometry problems, significantly outperforming previous state-of-the-art automated theorem provers.

He left Google and co-founded the AI research start-up Discovery Loop in 2026 together with Jeff Dean, Sanjay Ghemawat, and Oriol Vinyals. Their goal is to automate the entire experimental loop of science and engineering using artificial intelligence.

== Honors and awards ==
Le was named MIT Technology Review's innovators under 35 in 2014. He has been interviewed by and his research has been reported in major media outlets including Wired, The New York Times, The Atlantic, and the MIT Technology Review. His work on the 2012 Google Brain project, which pioneered large-scale unsupervised learning, received an ICML Test of Time Honorable Mention Award in 2022. Le was named an Alumni Laureate of the Australian National University School of Computing in 2022. In 2024, Le received the NeurIPS Test of Time Award for the seminal paper "Sequence to Sequence Learning with Neural Networks" (co-authored with Ilya Sutskever and Oriol Vinyals). The award committee described the work as a "cornerstone" of modern AI, noting that it established the encoder-decoder architecture and laid the necessary foundation for the large language models (LLMs) and foundation models that followed.

== See also ==
- Oriol Vinyals
- Ilya Sutskever
- Jeff Dean
