= David Ha =

Machine learning researcher and CEO

- Born: British Hong Kong
- Citizenship: Canadian
- Education: University of Toronto (BS, MS), University of Tokyo (PhD)
- Occupation: Machine learning researcher
- Employer: Sakana AI

David Ha is a Canadian machine learning researcher, co-founder and CEO of Sakana AI.

== Biography ==
Ha was born in British Hong Kong. He received an undergraduate degree in engineering science and a masters in mathematical finance from the University of Toronto and a PhD from the University of Tokyo. He worked as a derivatives trader, becoming a managing director at Goldman Sachs in Japan. For six years he worked at Google as a researcher, helping create and lead Google Brain in Tokyo. In 2022, Ha left Google to join Stability AI as head of research. In June 2023, he resigned from Stability to found Sakana AI along with his former Google colleague Llion Jones, also joined by Ren Ito. Ha was named one of TIME 100 Most Influential People in AI 2025.
