= Sakana AI =

Japanese AI company

Sakana AI Co, Ltd.
- Native name: Sakana AI株式会社
- Type: Private
- Industry: Information technology
- Founded: July 2023; 3 years ago
- Founders: David Ha; Llion Jones; Ren Ito
- Headquarters: Tokyo, Japan
- Number of employees: 20 (2024)
- Website: sakana.ai

Sakana AI Co, Ltd. is a Japanese artificial intelligence company based in Tokyo.

== Overview ==
Sakana AI's main research fields are evolution and collective intelligence of AI. The company's name is derived from the Japanese word for fish. This represents the idea of a school of fish coming together and forming a coherent entity from simple rules, which is an analogy for collective intelligence.

The company was founded in 2023 by David Ha, Llion Jones and Ren Ito. Llion Jones co-authored the paper "Attention Is All You Need" when he was working for Google in 2017. In September 2026, Jürgen Schmidhuber joined as chief scientific officer.

The company raised US$30M in its seed funding round from Lux Capital and Khosla Ventures. The company raised approximately $200M from companies such as Mitsubishi UFJ, SMBC, Mizuho, Itochu, KDDI, Nomura and Nvidia in its series A funding round in 2024. The Nikkei estimated the company's value at 19 billion yen in 2024. In January 2026, Google also invested in Sakana AI, following a ¥20 billion ($135 million) Series B funding round valuing the startup at about $2.65 billion in November 2025. They raised 31 billion yen in the first half of 2026, with investors including Google, Salesforce Ventures and major Japanese financial institutions.

In January 2024, Sakana AI developed a method to build new AI models by 'breeding' multiple existing models, which it sees as a means to democratise AI development, as this process does not require large computational resources. Sakana AI is also developing a model called the AI Scientist, which automates the entire process of scientific research. They published a paper on the topic in Nature in March 2026.

== See also ==
- Collective intelligence
