= Interlanguage (disambiguation) =

An interlanguage is an emerging language system in the mind of a second language learner.

Interlanguage or interlingual may also refer to:

- A term in interlinguistics referring to any language used between people who cannot communicate by means of their first languages
- A pivot language, any intermediary language used as a tool for translation between many different languages
- A Koiné language, any contact language from mutually intelligible dialects of the same language
- A zonal auxiliary language, any language constructed to bridge a language family

== See also ==
- Interlingua
