= Oriol Vinyals =

Spanish machine learning researcher

- Born: 1983 (age 42–43); Sabadell, Catalonia, Spain
- Education: Universitat Politècnica de Catalunya; University of California, San Diego; University of California, Berkeley
- Known for: seq2seq AlphaStar
- Scientific career
- Workplaces: Google; DeepMind; Discovery Loop
- Thesis: Beyond Deep Learning: Scalable Methods and Models for Learning (2013)
- Doctoral advisor: Nelson Morgan

Oriol Vinyals (born 1983) is a Spanish machine learning researcher. He has developed most of his career at DeepMind. He is a co-founder of Discovery Loop, and was technical lead on Gemini until August 2026, along with Jeff Dean.

== Education and career ==
Vinyals was born in Sabadell, Catalonia, Spain. He studied mathematics and telecommunication engineering at the Universitat Politècnica de Catalunya. He then moved to the US and studied for a Master's degree in computer science at University of California, San Diego, and at University of California, Berkeley, where he received his PhD in 2013 under Nelson Morgan in the Department of Electrical Engineering and Computer Sciences.

Vinyals co-invented the seq2seq model for machine translation along with Ilya Sutskever and Quoc Viet Le. He led the AlphaStar research group at DeepMind, which applies artificial intelligence to computer games such as StarCraft II.

In 2016, he was chosen by the magazine MIT Technology Review as one of the 35 most innovative young people under 35.

By 2022 he was a principal research scientist at DeepMind. His research in DeepMind is regularly featured in the mainstream media As of August 2024, he was technical lead on Gemini, along with Noam Shazeer and Jeff Dean.

On 2025 he received an honorary doctoral degree by his home university, UPC.

On August 5, 2026 he announced he was leaving Gemini to start Discovery Loop, together with Jeff Dean, Quoc Le and Sanjay Ghemawat.

== See also ==
- Ilya Sutskever
