= Interlingua (disambiguation) =

Interlingua is an auxiliary language developed by the International Auxiliary Language Association.

Interlingua may also refer to:

- An alternative name for Latino sine flexione, an auxiliary language developed by Giuseppe Peano as a controlled variant of Neo-Latin. This language is sometimes referred to as Peano's Interlingua (abbreviated as IL)
- A general term describing any international auxiliary language. See also interlinguistics.
- A language-neutral representation of semantic and grammatical concepts; see Interlingual machine translation.
- A name given to the fictional "basic speech" used in science fiction settings, such as Star Trek and the works of Robert A. Heinlein.

== See also ==
- Interlingue, more commonly known as Occidental, an auxiliary language originally devised by Edgar de Wahl
