= Birla Institute of Technology, Mesra =

Engineering Institution in Jharkhand, India

Coordinates: 23°25′00″N 85°26′25″E

- Motto: Sā Vidyā Yā Vimuktaye
- Motto in English: Learning is that which Liberates
- Type: GFTI; Deemed University
- Established: 1955 (71 years ago)
- Affiliations: UGC, NAAC, PCI, COA
- Chancellor: C. K. Birla
- Vice-Chancellor: Dr. Indranil Manna
- Faculty: 380 (2026–2027)
- Students: 6906 (2024–2025)
- Undergraduates: 5161 (2024–2025)
- Postgraduates: 1745 (2024–2025)
- Doctoral students: 292 (Full Time, 2021-2022), 45 (Part Time, 2021-2022)
- Location: Ranchi, Jharkhand, India
- Campus: 780 acres (320 ha); Sub-Urban
- Website: www.bitmesra.ac.in

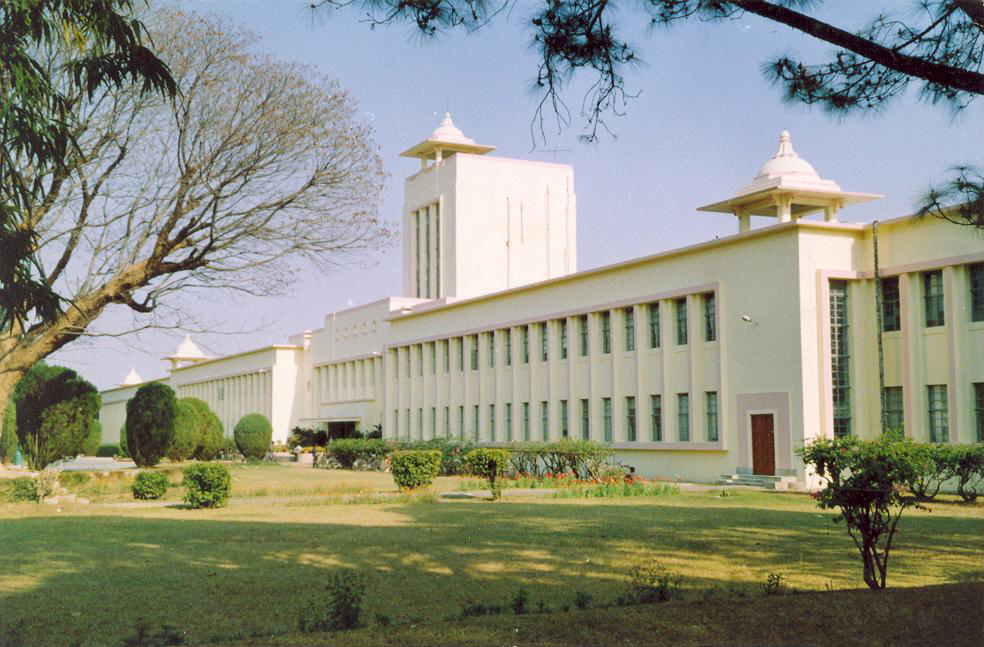
BIT Mesra main building

Birla Institute of Technology, Mesra (BIT, Mesra) is a government funded technical institute (GFTI) situated at Ranchi, Jharkhand, India. It was declared as a deemed university under Section 3 of the UGC Act. The institute was included under Section 12B of the UGC Act, 1956, in November 2023.

== History ==
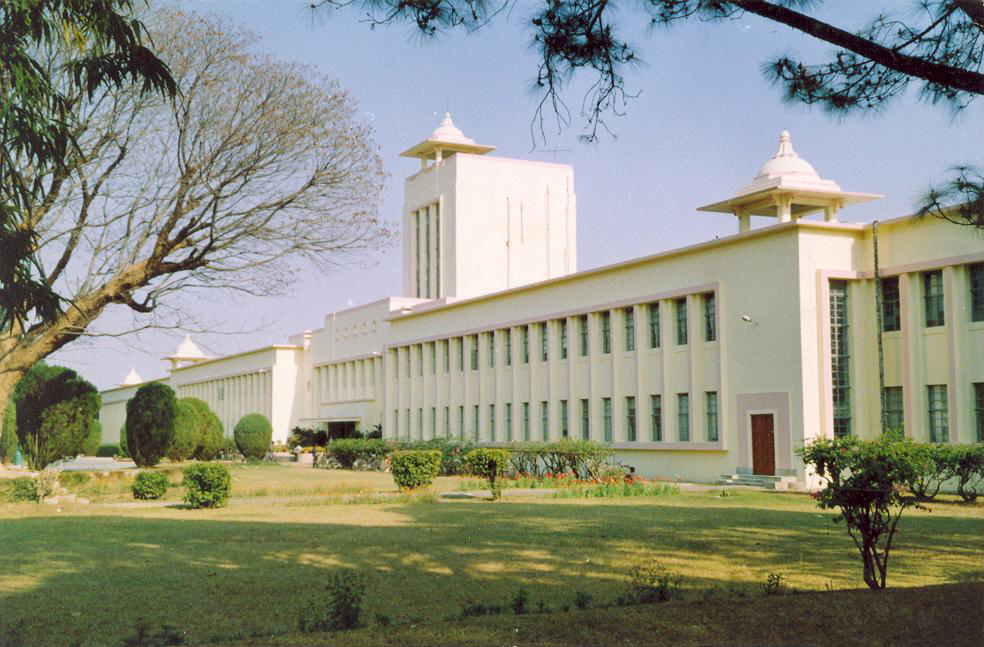
BIT Mesra Main Building

The Birla Institute of Technology was established in 1955 at Mesra by industrialist and philanthropist B. M. Birla. The institute was affiliated with Patna University until 1960, and then with Ranchi University. In 1986 BIT was elevated to the status of a deemed university under section 3 of the University Grants Commission Act, 1956.

BIT was the first institute in India to set up a department of space engineering and rocketry, in 1964.

The Small Industries Research and Development Organization (SIRDO) was set up in 1970 to support small manufacturing enterprises managed by graduates of BIT. Companies created from this concept include Meditron and Alcast. This idea was recognized by the Department of Science and Technology, Government of India, which spread the concept to other institutes such as IITs, under the concept name Science and Technological Entrepreneurs Park (STEP). The first STEP was approved and located in BIT Mesra. The entrepreneurship development cell was founded in 2007 and is run by the students. For financial support, BIT set up the SIDBI Centre for Innovation and Incubation (SCII) by an arrangement with Small Industries Development Bank of India (SIDBI) to provide funds for a limited period of time to select new entrepreneurs, start up companies, and technology based organisations. BIT Mesra has a PARAM 10000 supercomputer at the core of its IT infrastructure.

== Campus ==
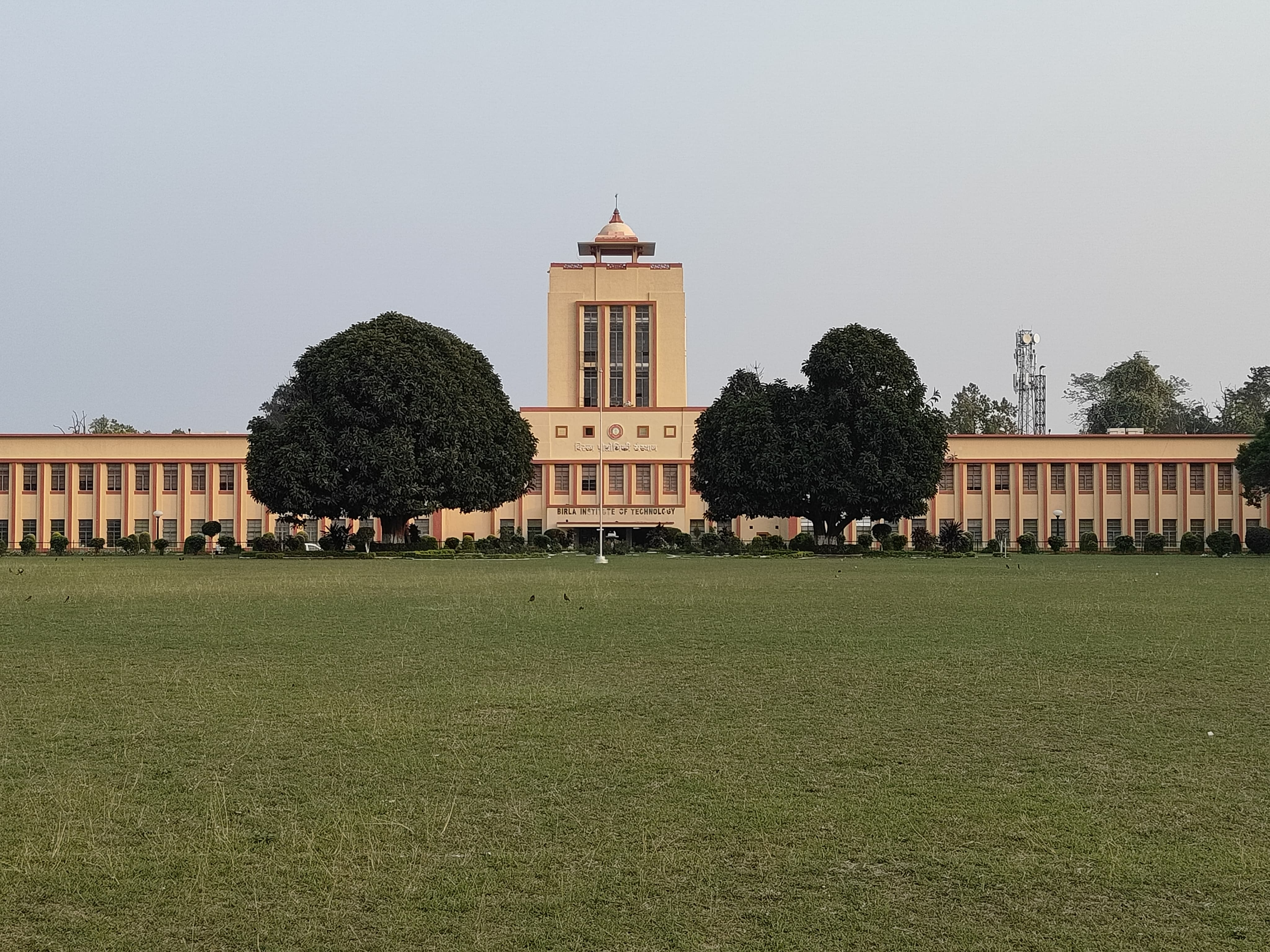
Main building front side.

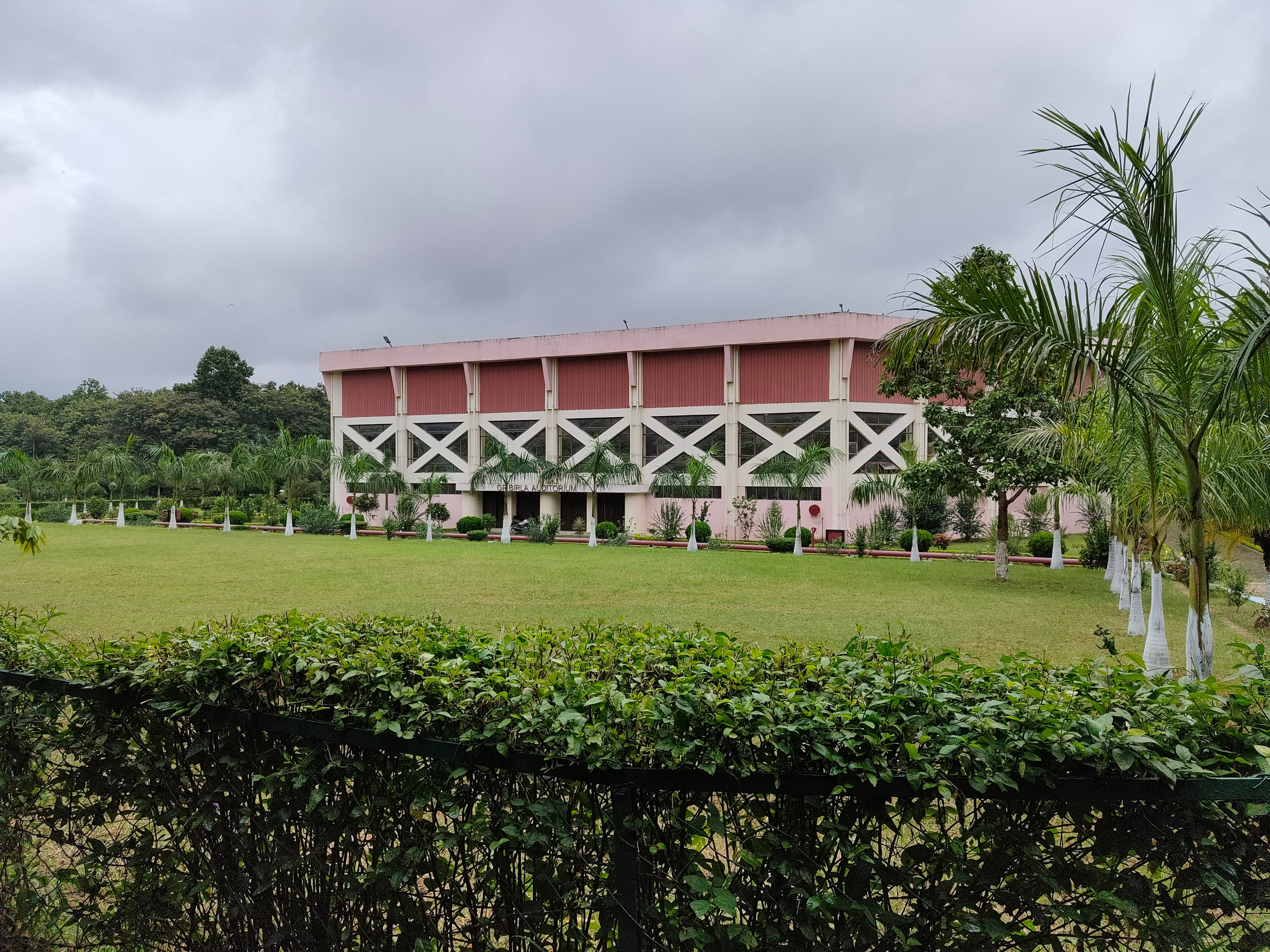
GP Birla Auditorium

- Built up covered area exceeding 840,000 sq ft (78,000 m^{2})
- Golden Jubilee auditorium as well as a Mini auditorium
- PARAM 10000 super computer
- 100 Mbit/s LAN Connection in all BIT hostels rooms(1Gbit/s in newly built floors)
- R&D building housing computer and scientific labs.
- A three storied library. There is a separate internet facility inside the library in order to let students read IEEE and other journals
- Lord Shiva temple

=== Central facilities ===
R&D Building

Central Library The Central Library was established in 1955. It has print and electronic resources in the fields of science and technology. The collection includes 10,000 online journals, 100 print journals, 113,000 books, 2500 CDs, 60 audiocassettes and 4000 project reports.

== Organisation and administration ==
=== Governance ===
BIT functions under the control of a Board of Governors, comprising representatives of the Ministry of Human Resource Development, Government of India, the UGC, the State Government, the Chancellor, the A.I.C.T.E., the Hindustan Charity Trust and the Institute Faculty. C. K. Birla is the chairman of the board of governors and also the chancellor of the institute. The Technical Council headed by vice chancellor decides the academic policy of the institute.

=== Departments ===
BIT Mesra has the following departments

- Architecture and Planning
- Bioengineering and Biotechnology
- Centre for Food Engineering and Technology
- Chemical Engineering
- Chemistry
- Civil Engineering
- Computer Science and Engineering
- Department of Quantitative Economics and Data Science
- Electrical and Electronics Engineering
- Electronics and Communication Engineering
- Humanities and Social Sciences
- Management
- Mathematics
- Mechanical Engineering
- Pharmaceutical Sciences and Technology
- Physics
- Production and Industrial Engineering
- Remote Sensing
- Space Engineering and Rocketry

=== University Polytechnic ===
The University Polytechnic was established in 2001, as a joint venture of the Department of Welfare, Government of Jharkhand and BIT, Mesra, to impart Diploma level technical education amongst the youths of Jharkhand. Its campus is located close to the National Highway 33 in the vicinity of the BIT Main campus on the outskirts of Ranchi.

==== Deoghar Extension Centre ====
In order to expand BIT further across the state, the Jharkhand government asked the institute to establish an Extension Centre at Deoghar, Jharkhand. A MoU was signed between the Institute and the Government of Jharkhand. In October 2007, Birla Institute of Technology extension Deoghar began to operate. As per the provisions of the MoU it was decided that 50% of spaces would be for students acquiring eligible qualifications from Institutions located in Jharkhand while the remaining 50% would be for students from other states of the country. Admission has been through JEE Main with Central Counseling conducted by the Central Counseling Board.

==== Patna Extension Centre ====
Birla Institute of Technology, Patna Campus was established in 2006, on the initiative of Govt. of Bihar. The institute came into existence by Public-Private Partnership (PPP) mode under flagship management of BIT Mesra. The Chief Minister of Bihar Nitish Kumar, laid the foundation stone of the institute in December 2005. The institute started its academic programme during the 2006–07 academic year.

=== Birla Institute of Scientific Research ===
The Birla Institute of Scientific Research (BISR) is a sister concern of Birla Institute of Technology, Mesra, Ranchi which hosts an auditorium and a planetarium in its campus in Jaipur. The institute was established for promoting science education through its museum and planetarium.

This institute has a state of the art Bioinformatics Centre in Department of Biotechnology and Bioinformatics and a Remote Sensing Department.

== Academics ==
=== Rankings ===
University rankings

General – international
- QS (Asia) (2024): 401-450

General – India
- NIRF (Overall) (2024): 101-150
- NIRF (Universities) (2024): 82

Engineering – India
- NIRF (2024): 48
- Outlook India (2024): 4

Business/Management – India
- NIRF (2024): 90

Pharmacy – India
- NIRF (2024): 32

Architecture – India
- NIRF (2024): 20

Birla Institute of Technology, Mesra was ranked at 401-450 band in the recent 2024 QS World Rankings (Asian Category). Among engineering colleges, Birla Institute of Technology, Mesra ranked 16th by India Today in National Institutional Ranking Framework and fourth among private engineering colleges by Outlook India in 2024.

The Birla Institute of Technology, Mesra was ranked 48th among Engineering Colleges in India by the National Institutional Ranking Framework in the 2024 rankings.

== Notable alumni ==
- Karan Bajaj, Indian technology entrepreneur, founder of WhiteHat Junior.
- Madhavan Chandradathan, Director, Vikram Sarabhai Space Centre (VSSC)
- Arup Roy Choudhury, Former Chairman of The Board - NTPC
- Kannan Gopinathan, former IAS officer and Congress Party member
- Nishant Kumar, Bihari politician and son of Nitish Kumar.
- Anjan Lahiri, Former CEO BirlaSoft, Co-Founder Mindtree
- Ajit Kumar Mehta, former Member of Indian Parliament (Lok Sabha) from Samastipur Lok Sabha constituency.
- Shree K. Nayar, T. C. Chang Professor, Computer Science, Columbia University
- Deven Sharma, Indian businessman, President of Standard and Poors
- Hemant Soren, 5th Chief Minister of Jharkhand
- V. Vaidyanathan, CEO of IDFC First Bank
- Ashish Vaswani, AI researcher, co-author of "Attention Is All You Need"

== See also ==
- Birla Institute of Technology International Centre
- Waljat Colleges of Applied Sciences
- CK Birla Group
