= Birla Institute of Technology International Centre =

Institute in Bahrain

Birla Institute of Technology International Centre, Bahrain
- مركز معهد بيرلا العالمي للتكنولوجيا، البحرين
- Active: 2000–2013
- Affiliations: BIT Mesra, Ranchi, India
- Director: T.R. Ranganath
- Location: Budaiya, Kingdom of Bahrain
- Website: BIT Mesra, Ranchi, India

Birla Institute of Technology International Centre (BITIC), Bahrain (Arabic: مركز معهد بيرلا العالمي للتكنولوجيا، البحرين) was the first international campus of Birla Institute of Technology, located in Budaiya, Bahrain. The Birla Institute of Technology system is based in India and focuses on technical and management education. The campus in Bahrain was established in 2000 and closed in 2013.

== Parent University ==
BITIC offers degree programs of Birla Institute of Technology, Mesra (BIT, Mesra), India. The course curriculum and the teaching, learning process are exactly similar to that of BIT, Mesra. BIT was established by philanthropist industrialist Mr. B.M. Birla in 1955 at Ranchi, the industrial centre of India. BIT is a full member of the Association of Commonwealth Universities. It was conferred Deemed University status in 1986 due to the achievements of the Institute, both in terms of research and excellent standards of academic programmes. The Institute has been accredited by the National Assessment & Accreditation Council (NAAC), and the National Board of Accreditation (NBA) established by the UGC & AICTE respectively.

BIT has consistently been ranked among top institutes in India in the field of Engineering by leading Indian publications like India Today, Outlook, Dataquest India, Mint etc.

== Academic programs ==
BITIC, Bahrain offered following Academic Programs:

- Bachelor of Engineering (BE)
  - Computer Science & Engineering
  - Electrical & Electronics Engineering
  - Electronics & Communication Engineering
  - Mechanical Engineering
  - Production Engineering
- Master in Business Administration (MBA)
- Executive MBA Programme for working professionals
- Bachelor of Business Administration (BBA)
- BSc in Information Technology
- B.Com. (E-Commerce)
- Diploma in Technology
  - Computer Science & Engineering
  - Production Engineering

== Alumni ==
- Hitesh Megchiani - Entrepreneur & Public Speaker

== See also ==
- Birla Institute of Technology, Mesra
- Birla Institute of Technology – Science and Technology Entrepreneurs' Park
- Waljat Colleges of Applied Sciences
