= Cue (search engine) =

Former company

- Former name: Greplin
- Dissolved: 2013
- Headquarters: San Francisco
- Website: www.cueup.com
- Launched: 2010
- Current status: Discontinued

Cue (formerly known as Greplin) was a website and app co-founded by Daniel Gross, Shai Magzimof, and Robby Walker that pulled information from online accounts to present an overview of a user's day.

== Company info ==
Cue operated by linking various user accounts belonging to a registered individual and running a query search for keywords within those applications or accounts. For example, someone may have wanted to use a single search feature to check their Facebook, LinkedIn and Twitter accounts without signing in and checking each one individually.

Cue acted as a desktop search, indexing online social networking accounts, and thereby creating a "personal cloud." Cue offered a free version that allowed users to add a certain number of accounts, while a paid version allowed users the option to "unlock" other sources and get more index space.

In 2011, Cue raised $4 million in funding from venture capital firm Sequoia. Their premium services were $5 per month, which included 500 MB of extra storage space, and $15 per month for an additional 2 GB.

== Shut down ==
In October 2013, Apple bought the company, for a price estimated between $35 and $45 million. Cue premium users were refunded.

== See also ==
- Locker
