= Deven Sharma =

Indian businessman

- Born: 1956 (age 69–70); Dhanbad, Bihar Now Jharkhand, India
- Education: De Nobili School, FRI; Birla Institute of Technology; University of Wisconsin–Milwaukee; Ohio State University
- Occupation: President of Standard & Poor's
- Board member of: CRISIL Ltd

Deven Sharma (born 1956 in Jharkhand) is an Indian businessman.

== Biography ==
=== Early life and education ===
Sharma attended De Nobili School, FRI, Digwadih, Dhanbad. He received his Bachelor's Degree from Birla Institute of Technology, Ranchi, India, a Master's Degree from University of Wisconsin–Milwaukee and a Doctoral degree in Business Management from Ohio State University.

=== Career ===
He was named president of Standard & Poor's in August 2007. In August 2011, he announced that he would step down from the position of president later in the year.

Sharma serves on the boards of CRISIL, The US-China Business Council and Asia Society Business Council. He served as a Director of 1-800-Flowers.com Inc. from 12 May 2005 to 16 March 2007.

Deven Sharma became the public face of the firm in the wake of its downgrade of the United States' long-term debt rating on 5 August 2011. According to Reuters News Service, S&P announced on 23 August 2011 that Deven Sharma would step down as a Chief of Standard & Poor's effective 12 September 2011, and would leave the company by the end of the year.
