= Safe Superintelligence Inc. =

American artificial intelligence company

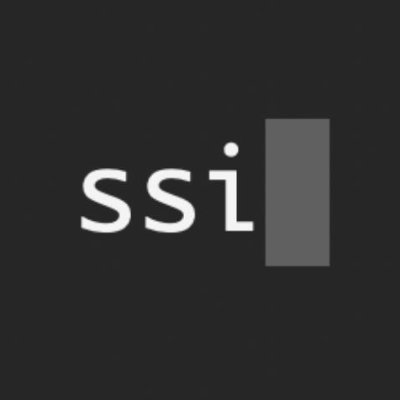
- Industry: Artificial intelligence
- Founded: June 19, 2024
- Founders: Ilya Sutskever; Daniel Gross; Daniel Levy
- Headquarters: Palo Alto, California; Tel Aviv, Israel
- Key people: Ilya Sutskever (CEO)
- Number of employees: 50 (July 2025)
- Website: ssi.inc

Safe Superintelligence Inc. (SSI) is an American artificial intelligence company founded by Ilya Sutskever, the former chief scientist of OpenAI, Daniel Gross, former head of Apple’s AI efforts, and Daniel Levy, an investor and former AI researcher at OpenAI. The company's mission is to focus on safely developing a superintelligence, a computer-based agent capable of surpassing human intelligence.

Sutskever left OpenAI in May 2024, following the removal as CEO of Sam Altman the previous November. SSI reached a $30 billion valuation following a March 2025 funding round. In early 2025, Sutskever rejected an attempt by Meta Platforms to acquire SSI; in July co-founder Gross left SSI for Meta Superintelligence Labs and Sutskever became CEO of SSI. In July 2026, Nvidia entered a partnership with SSI, planning to invest $5 billion and scale SSI's compute by "an order of magnitude".

== History ==
On May 15, 2024, OpenAI co-founder Ilya Sutskever left OpenAI. On November 17, 2023, Sutskever voted for the removal of Sam Altman as CEO of OpenAI amid concerns about communication and trust. Sutskever was instrumental to Sam Altman's removal, compiling a 70-page dossier that claimed Altman had a "consistent pattern of [...] lying". Sutskever and others additionally believed that OpenAI was neglecting its original focus on safety in favor of pursuing opportunities for commercialization, such as seeking billions from Gulf Cooperation Council sovereign wealth funds to develop a neural processing unit to compete with Nvidia. After OpenAI's board of directors appointed Emmett Shear as CEO, Sutskever publicly apologized for his participation in the board's previous actions and joined a letter by the company's employees calling for the board's resignation.

On June 19, 2024, Sutskever posted on X that he was starting SSI Inc, with the goal to safely develop superintelligent AI, alongside Daniel Levy and Daniel Gross.

In September 2024, SSI revealed it had raised $1 billion from venture capital firms including SV Angel, DST Global, Sequoia Capital, and Andreessen Horowitz. The money will be used to build up more computing power and hire top individuals in the field.

In March 2025, SSI reached a $30 billion valuation in a funding round led by Greenoaks Capital. This is six times its previous $5 billion valuation from September 2024. Despite not yet generating revenue and having approximately 20 employees, the company has attracted significant investor interest, largely due to co-founder Ilya Sutskever's reputation and its focus on developing safe superintelligence.

In April 2025, Google Cloud announced a partnership to provide Tensor Processing Units for SSI's research.

In the first half of 2025, Meta attempted to acquire SSI but was rebuffed by Sutskever. In July 2025, co-founder Gross left the company to join Meta Superintelligence Labs, and Sutskever became the CEO of SSI.

On 27 July 2026, SSI and Nvidia announced a strategic partnership expanding SSI's compute by an order of magnitude. The deal included a planned $5 billion investment into SSI.

== Culture ==
The company, composed of a small team, is split between Palo Alto, California and Tel Aviv, Israel. The company's website states that it is the "world’s first straight-shot SSI lab", and intended to be unaffected by "management overhead or product cycles ... insulated from short-term commercial pressures". SSI employees are discouraged from listing their affiliation on LinkedIn, ostensibly due to increased employee poaching in 2025.

SSI's US headquarters are at 317 University Avenue, Palo Alto, California. In February 2025, SSI leased offices at 144 Menachem Begin Road in Midtown Tel Aviv, Israel.

== See also ==
- AI safety
- Artificial general intelligence
- Existential risk from AI
- OpenAI
- Superintelligence: Paths, Dangers, Strategies
