= Daniel Gross (businessman) =

American entrepreneur

- דניאל גרוס
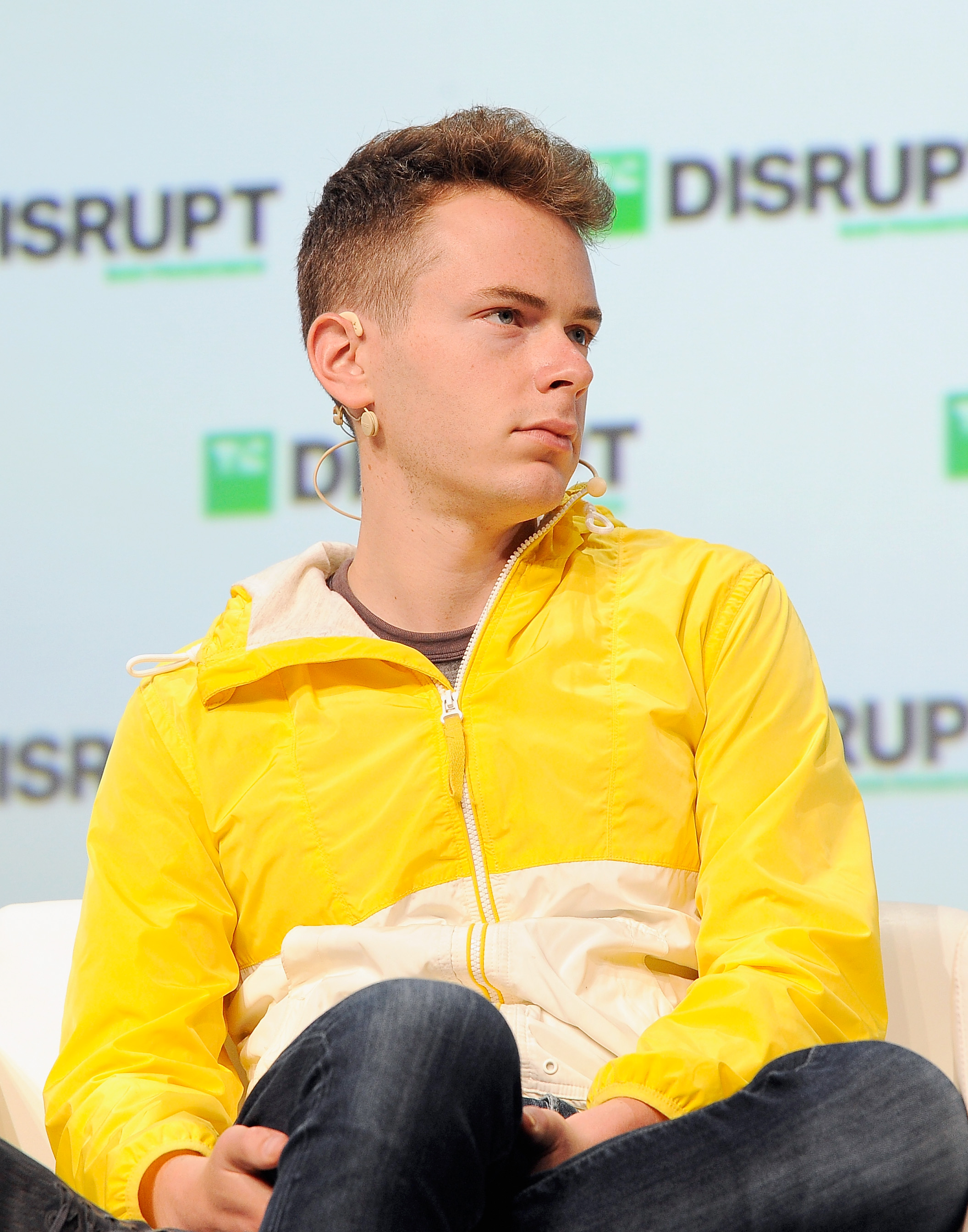
- Gross in 2018
- Born: 1991 (age 34–35); Jerusalem
- Occupation: Businessman
- Known for: Cue, AI Grant, Andromeda
- Website: dcgross.com

Daniel Gross (Hebrew: דניאל גרוס) is an Israeli-American businessman who co-founded Cue, led artificial intelligence efforts at Apple, served as a partner at Y Combinator, and is a notable technology investor in companies such as Uber, Instacart, Figma, GitHub, Airtable, Rippling, CoreWeave, Character.ai, Perplexity AI, and others. In June 2024, he co-founded Safe Superintelligence Inc. Time 100 has listed Gross as one of the "Most Influential People in AI". In June 2025, Gross joined Meta, where he leads Meta Compute, Meta's initiative to expand its AI computing infrastructure.

== Career ==
=== Cue and Apple (2010–2016) ===
Gross was born in Jerusalem in 1991. Raised as what he describes as an Orthodox Jew, he expected to lead a traditional religious life somewhere in Israel. While attending a mechina before his IDF enlistment, he applied to Y Combinator on a whim, and at the time, he was the youngest founder ever accepted. He started angel investing in 2011.

Gross launched Greplin, a search engine, in 2010 along with Robby Walker. Greplin was designed to allow users to search online accounts (such as social media, email, and cloud storage) from one location without checking each individually. In 2011, Greplin raised $4 million from venture capital firm Sequoia Capital. At 19, Gross was one of Sequoia's youngest founders. In 2011, Forbes named Gross one of "30 Under 30" in the "Pioneers in Technology" category, and Business Insider named Gross one of the "25 under 25" in Silicon Valley.

In 2012 Greplin renamed itself Cue and launched additional predictive search features. The company raised $10 million in November 2012 from Index Ventures. In 2013, Apple acquired Cue for an undisclosed amount reported to be between $40 million and $60 million. Cue was shut down by Apple shortly after the purchase. Gross then joined Apple as a director focused on machine learning. In 2014, Forbes named him one of "30 under 30 Influential Young People in Tech".

=== Y Combinator and Pioneer (2017–2018) ===
In 2017, Gross joined Y Combinator as a partner, where he focused on artificial intelligence. He created a dedicated "YC AI" program, starting Y-Combinator's AI program.

In August 2018, Gross created Pioneer, an early-stage, remote startup accelerator and fund, focused on finding talented and ambitious people around the world.

=== AI investing (2021–2025) ===
In 2021, Gross and Nat Friedman started making significant investments in the AI space, as well as running a program that gives $250,000 in funding to AI-native companies called AI Grant. In 2023, they deployed the Andromeda Cluster, a supercomputer cluster consisting of 2,512 H100s GPUs for use by startups in their portfolio. The project cost around $100 million, including electricity and cooling, and as of 2024, had 4,000 GPUs.

In 2023, Time 100 listed Gross as one of the "Most Influential People in AI". In 2024, Gross led a founding round in Perplexity AI, an AI search company. In June 2024, Ilya Sutskever announced that he was starting Safe Superintelligence Inc. along with Gross and Daniel Levy, the former head of the "Optimization Team" at OpenAI.

Gross and Nat Friedman also founded NFDG, a venture capital firm that by 2024 had invested in companies such as Safe Superintelligence. Gross and Friedman invested $3.9 million in the AI company Pulse in February 2025.

In July 2025 Gross left Safe Superintelligence to join Meta Superintelligence Labs.
