= Ilya Sutskever =

Computer scientist (born 1986)

Ilya Sutskever FRS
- איליה סוצקבר
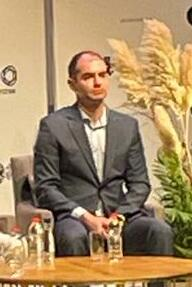
- Sutskever at Tel Aviv University in 2023
- Born: 1986 (age 39–40); Gorky, Soviet Union
- Citizenship: Israel, Canada
- Education: University of Toronto (BSc, MSc, PhD)
- Known for: AlexNet; Co-founding OpenAI and Safe Superintelligence Inc.
- Scientific career
- Fields: Computer science
- Workplaces: University of Toronto; Google Brain; OpenAI
- Thesis: Training recurrent neural networks (2013)
- Doctoral advisor: Geoffrey Hinton

Ilya Sutskever (Hebrew: איליה סוצקבר; born 1986) is a Soviet-born Israeli-Canadian computer scientist who specializes in artificial intelligence, particularly machine learning. He has made several major contributions to the field of deep learning, including sequence-to-sequence learning, reasoning models, GPT models, and contributions to CLIP, DALL-E, and AlphaGo. With Alex Krizhevsky and Geoffrey Hinton, he co-created AlexNet, a convolutional neural network. Sutskever was one of the co-founders of OpenAI, where he served as chief scientist, overseeing the research breakthroughs that led to large language models and the launch of ChatGPT. He also led the research that led to reasoning models such as o1.

In 2023, he was one of the members of OpenAI's board that ousted Sam Altman as its CEO; Altman was reinstated a week later, and Sutskever stepped down from the board. In June 2024, Sutskever co-founded the company Safe Superintelligence Inc., alongside Daniel Gross and Daniel Levy. Within a year, the company was valued at more than $30 billion.

One of the most highly cited computer scientists in history, he has won the NeurIPS Test of Time Award for his lasting impact on AI research three times in a row (2022–2024) and received the National Academy of Sciences Award for the Industrial Application of Science in 2026.

== Early life and education ==
Sutskever was born in 1986 to a Russian-Jewish family in Nizhny Novgorod, Russia (then Gorky, Russian SFSR, Soviet Union). At the age of 5, he immigrated to Israel with his family and grew up in Jerusalem. Sutskever did well in school, and in eighth grade started taking classes at the Open University of Israel.

At 16, he moved with his family to Canada, where he attended high school for a month before being admitted to the University of Toronto in Ontario as a third-year undergraduate student at University College.

At the University of Toronto, Sutskever received a bachelor's degree in mathematics in 2005, a master's degree in computer science in 2007, and a PhD in computer science in 2013. His doctoral advisor was Geoffrey Hinton.

In 2012, Sutskever built AlexNet in collaboration with Hinton and Alex Krizhevsky.

== Career and research ==
In 2012, Sutskever spent about two months as a postdoc with Andrew Ng at Stanford University. He then returned to the University of Toronto and joined Hinton's new research company DNNResearch, a spinoff of Hinton's research group. In 2013, Google acquired DNNResearch and hired Sutskever as a research scientist at Google Brain.

At Google Brain, Sutskever worked with Oriol Vinyals and Quoc Viet Le to create the sequence-to-sequence learning algorithm, and worked on TensorFlow. He is also one of the AlphaGo paper's many co-authors.

At the end of 2015, Sutskever left Google to become cofounder and chief scientist of the newly founded organization OpenAI.

In 2022, Sutskever tweeted, "it may be that today's large neural networks are slightly conscious", which triggered debates about AI consciousness. He is considered to have played a key role in the development of ChatGPT, and later in leading the research that led to reasoning models. He is credited with establishing OpenAI’s scaling ethos. In 2023, he announced that he would co-lead OpenAI's new "Superalignment" project, which was trying to solve the alignment of superintelligences within four years. He wrote that even if superintelligence seems far off, it could happen this decade.

Sutskever was formerly one of the six board members of OpenAI. In November 2023, the board fired Sam Altman, stating that "he was not consistently candid in his communications with the board". Sutskever authored a 52-page memo which relied heavily on information from Mira Murati, accusing Altman of lying, manipulating executives, and fostering internal division. Sutskever submitted the memo to the board after months of tension and dissatisfaction with Altman's leadership style, and ultimately joined the board in voting for Altman's termination. In an all-hands company meeting shortly after the board meeting, Sutskever said that firing Altman was "the board doing its duty", but the next week, he expressed regret at having participated in Altman's ouster. Altman's firing and the subsequent resignation of OpenAI co-founder Greg Brockman led three senior researchers to also resign from OpenAI. After that, Sutskever stepped down from the OpenAI board and was absent from OpenAI's office. Some sources suggested he was leading the team remotely, while others said he no longer had access to the team's work.

In May 2024, Sutskever announced his departure from OpenAI to focus on a new project that was "very personally meaningful" to him. His decision followed a turbulent period at OpenAI marked by leadership crises and internal debates about the direction of AI development and alignment protocols. Jan Leike, the other leader of the superalignment project, announced his departure hours later, citing an erosion of safety and trust in OpenAI's leadership.

In June 2024, Sutskever announced Safe Superintelligence Inc. (SSI), a new company he founded with Daniel Gross and Daniel Levy with offices in Palo Alto and Tel Aviv. In contrast to OpenAI, which releases revenue-generating products, Sutskever said the new company's "first product will be the safe superintelligence, and it will not do anything else up until then". In September 2024, the company announced that it had raised $1 billion from venture capital firms including Andreessen Horowitz, Sequoia Capital, DST Global, and SV Angel. In March 2025, Safe Superintelligence Inc. raised $2 billion more and reportedly reached a $32 billion valuation, notably due to Sutskever's reputation. In June 2025, SSI rejected an offer from Meta Platforms to buy the company. Sutskever became CEO of SSI shortly thereafter, after co-founder and CEO Gross left for Meta.

In an October 2024 interview after winning the Nobel Prize in Physics, Geoffrey Hinton expressed support for Sutskever's decision to fire Altman, emphasizing concerns about AI safety.

The Bloomberg Billionaires Index estimated Ilya Sutskever's net worth at $13.8 billion as of July 2026, largely stemming from the $7 billion OpenAI stake he verified on the stand during the 2026 Musk v. Altman trial alongside a $6.75 billion holding in Safe Superintelligence

In July 2026, Nvidia announced it would invest $5 billion into SSI.

=== Awards and honors ===
- In 2015, Sutskever was named in MIT Technology Review's 35 Innovators Under 35.
- In 2018, he was the keynote speaker at Nvidia Ntech 2018 and AI Frontiers Conference 2018.
- In 2022, he was elected a Fellow of the Royal Society (FRS).
- In 2023 and 2024, included in Time's list of the 100 most influential people in AI
- In 2022, 2023, and 2024, he won Neural Information Processing Systems’ Test of Time award, which recognizes papers that significantly shaped the AI field over at least ten years.
- In 2025, he received an honorary doctorate from his alma mater, the University of Toronto
- In 2026, he received the National Academy of Sciences Award for the Industrial Application of Science, presented for the first time in artificial intelligence.

== In popular culture ==
In the 2026 film Artificial, Sutskever is portrayed by actor Yura Borisov.
