= Indranil Manna =

Indian academics

- Born: January 22, 1961 (age 65); Kolkata, West Bengal, India
- Occupation: VC of BIT Mesra

Indranil Manna is an academician, currently serving as the Vice Chancellor of Birla Institute of Technology, Mesra (BIT Mesra), Jharkhand, India.

Manna is a fellow of Indian Academy of Sciences, and The National Academy of Science, India,. He was a former vice-president of Indian National Science Academy (INSA), New Delhi. and Indian National Academy of Engineering (INAE).

== Early life and career ==
Manna was born on January 22, 1961, in Kolkata. He completed his secondary education and higher secondary education from Pannalal Institution, Kalyani, W.B. He completed his bachelor's degree in engineering from University of Calcutta (1983) and master's degree from IIT Kanpur (1984). He obtained his PhD from IIT Kharagpur in 1990. In 2017, he also received Honorary Doctor of Science Degrees DSc (hc) from two different universities such as Kazi Nazrul University and University of Kalyani respectively.

Manna started his career as a lecturer at IIT Kharagpur (1985) and reached the post of professor in 2003. In 2009, he became HAG Professor. He was appointed as the director of the CGCRI in March 2010 where he served for two years. He also served as the Director of IIT, Kanpur from 2012 to 2017.

== Research ==
His research focus include nanostructured materials, laser/plasma aided surface engineering, bainitic and special steel, microstructure-property correlation, nanofluid and ferrofluid and other similar areas. He has made several contributions in the studies of nano-fluid and laser/plasma assisted surface engineering, and amorphous/nanocrystalline Al-alloys. His work centered on tiny crystalline and structureless materials that strengthen aluminium alloys and steel and allow engineers to do more on the nanometre scale.

== Awards ==
He is a recipient of Premchand Raichand Scholarship (PRS) in the field of Applied Physics from Kolkata University, a TWAS Prize Winner in Engineering (for new methods for designing ceramic and metallic objects) and Jagadish Chandra Bose Fellowship Awardee. He also received Alexander von Humboldt Fellowship (2001)
