= Nelson Morgan =

American computer scientist

Nelson Harold Morgan
- Born: May 1949 (age 76); Buffalo, New York, USA
- Education: University of Chicago; University of California, Berkeley
- Scientific career
- Institutions: National Semiconductor; University of California, Berkeley
- Thesis: Room Acoustics Simulation with Discrete-time Hardware (1980)
- Doctoral advisor: Robert W. Brodersen
- Doctoral students: Oriol Vinyals
- Website: www2.eecs.berkeley.edu/Faculty/Homepages/morgan.html

Nelson Harold Morgan (born May, 1949) is an American computer scientist and professor in residence (emeritus) of electrical engineering and computer science at the University of California, Berkeley. Morgan is the co-inventor of the Relative Spectral (RASTA) approach to speech signal processing, first described in a technical report published in 1991. He is also the co-developer of the hybrid system approach to speech recognition, and more recently has focused on progressive political work.

== Education and career ==
Morgan was born in Buffalo, New York. He studied at University of Chicago, later he received his PhD as an NSF fellow from University of California, Berkeley in 1980 under the supervision of Robert W. Brodersen. Morgan worked at National Semiconductor before taking up the post as a professor in residence at University of California, Berkeley. At Berkeley, he founded ICSI's Realization Group, which later become known as the Speech Group, in 1988. He served as director of ICSI from 1999 through 2011.

== Research and contributions ==
In 1993, Morgan and Herve Bourlard published their work on the hybrid system approach to speech recognition, which uses neural networks probabilistically with Hidden Markov Models (HMMs). The system improved automatic speech recognition techniques based on HMMs by providing discriminative training, incorporating multiple input sources, and using a flexible architecture able to accommodate contextual inputs and feedbacks. The work has been described as "seminal.". Morgan won the 1996 IEEE Signal Processing Magazine Best Paper Award for a paper with Bourlard. Morgan and Bourlard were awarded the 2022 IEEE James L. Flanagan Speech and Audio Processing Award "For contributions to neural networks for statistical speech recognition."

Morgan was the principal investigator of the IARPA-funded project Outing Unfortunate Characteristics of HMMs, which sought to identify problems in automatic speech recognition technology. He also led a team of universities to build speech recognition systems for low resource languages as part of the IARPA Babel program.

Morgan was the former director of the International Computer Science Institute (ICSI), where he was also the Speech Group leader. He recently has focused on campaign reform through empowering volunteerism. In that work, he co-founded UpRise Campaigns with Antonia Scatton, and later co-founded Neighbors Forward AZ with Alison Porter. As of 2023, he is the Chair of the Census and Redistricting Committee in the Arizona Democratic Party.

Morgan has produced more than 200 publications, including four books,

== Honors and awards ==
Morgan is a fellow of the IEEE and the International Speech Communication Association. Together with Hervé Bourlard, he won the 1996 IEEE Signal Processing Magazine Best Paper Award and was awarded the 2022 IEEE James L. Flanagan Speech and Audio Processing Award "For contributions to neural networks for statistical speech recognition." He was on the editorial board of Speech Communication Magazine, of which he is a former co-editor-in-chief.
