= Waljat Colleges of Applied Sciences =

Coordinates: 23°33′58″N 58°10′00″E

Waljat College of Applied Sciences
- كليةولجات للعلوم التطبيقية
- Active: 2001–June 30, 2021
- Affiliations: BIT Mesra, Ranchi, India
- Dean: S.L.Gupta
- Location: Muscat, Oman
- Founder: Omar Bin Abdul Muniem Al Zawawi
- Website: www.waljatcollege.edu.om BIT Mesra, Ranchi, India

Waljat College of Applied Sciences (WCAS) (Arabic: كليةولجات للعلوم التطبيقية) was one of Oman's leading higher education institutes. It was established in October 2001 by H.E. Dr. Omar Bin Abdul Muniem Al Zawawi in academic partnership with Birla Institute of Technology (BIT, Mesra), India, one of India's premier universities. It was the second International Centre of BIT, Mesra. It used to provide education in the specialized branches of Engineering, Information Technology and Business Administration.

== Location ==
WCAS was located in the premises of Knowledge Oasis at Rusayl, a suburb of Muscat, the capital city of Oman. It used to enjoy the locational advantage of being close to companies like Microsoft, Oracle Corporation, Motorola etc.

== Affiliating university ==
WCAS used to offer degree programs of Birla Institute of Technology, Mesra (BIT, Mesra), India. The course curriculum and the teaching, learning process are exactly similar to that of BIT, Mesra. BIT was established by philanthropist industrialist Mr. B.M. Birla in 1955 at Ranchi, the industrial centre of India. BIT is a full member of the Association of Commonwealth Universities. It was conferred Deemed University status in 1986 due to the achievements of the Institute, both in terms of research and excellent standards of academic programmes. The Institute has been accredited by the National Assessment & Accreditation Council (NAAC) & the National Board of Accreditation (NBA) established by the UGC & AICTE respectively. BIT has consistently been ranked among top institutes in India in the field of Engineering by leading Indian publications like India Today, Outlook, Dataquest India, Mint etc. In 2018 due to a decision from the honorable Indian supreme court BIT Mesra withdrew its affiliation from Waljat.

== Infrastructure and facilities ==
All the facilities provided by WCAS were as per the norms laid down in the Criteria for Private Colleges recommended by the Ministry of Higher Education, Sultanate of Oman. The buildings of the college were spread over four blocks; Dean's Office, Department of Computer Science and Department of Electronics & Communication Engineering were located in Block I; Department of Management, Department of English and Library were located in Block II; The Admin & HR, Finance Department, Admission & Registration Department, IT Manager, Video Conference Facility, Medical Room were located in Block III, The Department of Biotechnology and Workshop were in Block IV Besides this the college had an Auditorium, Multipurpose hall, a canteen, language Lab., e-learning facility, computer lab and well equipped laboratory facilities. Ample car parking facility was also available.

== Academic programs ==
Waljat College of Applied Sciences used to offer the following degree programs of BIT, Mesra:

- Master of Business Administration (MBA)
- Executive Master of Business Administration (EMBA) - Part Time
- Bachelor of Engineering (BE)
  - Biotechnology
  - Computer Science & Engineering
  - Electronics & Communications Engineering
- Bachelor of Computer Applications (BCA)
- Bachelor of Business Administration (BBA)

BBA and BCA programs were also offered in part-time mode for working people. Following Diploma, and Advanced Diploma programs were also available as exit routes to the above-mentioned degree programs:

1. Diploma in Electronics and Communication / Computer Science / Computer Application / Business Administration.
2. Advanced Diploma in Electronics and Communication / Computer Science.

Based on the performance at the entrance evaluation tests for BE/BBA/BCA, students could have gotten admitted to one year foundation program, where they would have been taught subjects so that they can come up to the entry level of the respective graduate degree.

== Admissions ==
Admission process used to normally start from the month of May every year by way of announcing in leading newspapers of Oman.

- BE : On the basis of the entrance evaluation test conducted by WCAS in Muscat or CBSE-AIEEE examination score OR SAT -II Score.
- BBA/BCA : On the basis of the entrance evaluation test conducted by WCAS in Muscat.

== Training and placement ==
Training & Placement Cell used to function in the college with the aim of providing career counseling and placement opportunities to graduating students through campus recruitment in different private and public companies. Career Fair was organized every year to give an opportunity to students to interact with companies. The students of the final year could've participated in campus interviews both at the Mesra campus in India of the Birla Institute of Technology, and at their own campus of WCAS, Muscat. Students were successful in getting employment. Many local companies used to evince interest in hiring WCAS students.

== Closure ==
On the 27th of June 2021 it was announced that June 30th, 2021, would be the last working day for the college. Registration had already been closed since the 7th of May 2018 and the reason for the eventual closure was due to the University Grants Commission in India prohibiting the university Birla Institute of Technology, Mesra from affiliating with colleges outside of India causing Waljat College to have no affiliated university and so decided to close its operations.

== See also ==
- Birla Institute of Technology, Mesra
- Birla Institute of Technology International Centre
- Birla Institute of Technology – Science and Technology Entrepreneurs' Park
