= Llion Jones =

Machine learning researcher and CTO

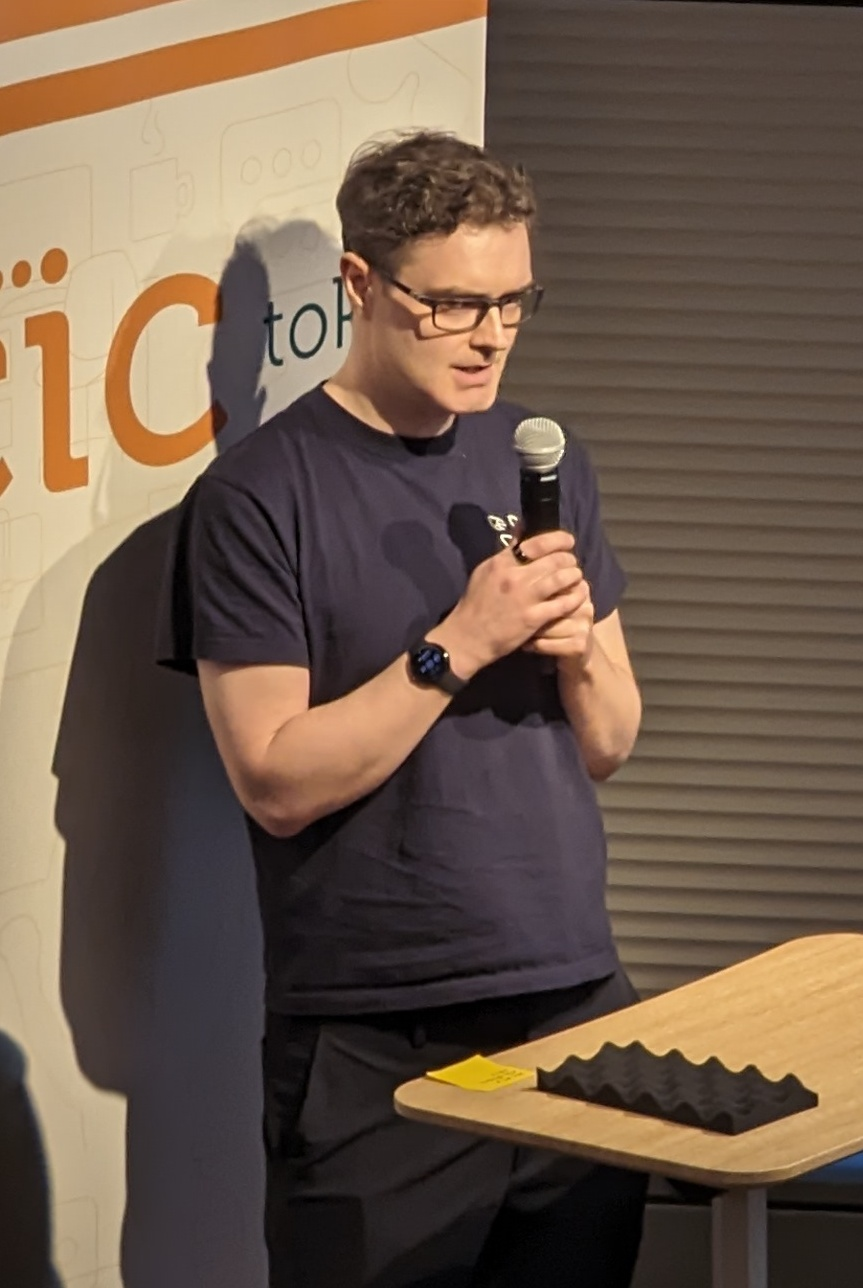
- Born: Bangor, Gwynedd, Wales
- Education: University of Birmingham (BSc, MSc)
- Occupation: Machine learning researcher
- Employer: Sakana AI

Llion Jones is a Welsh machine learning researcher, co-founder and CTO of Sakana AI.

== Biography ==
Jones was born 1984 in Bangor, raised in Bangor and Abergynolwyn in Gwynedd, Wales. He attended Coleg Meirion-Dwyfor, then received a bachelors in artificial intelligence and computer science and masters in advanced computer science from the University of Birmingham. Jones graduated in 2009, joining Google's YouTube as a software engineer in 2011 or 2012, then moving to research in machine intelligence and natural language processing at Google Research in 2015. Jones was a coauthor of "Attention is All You Need", a 2017 paper which introduced the transformer.

In 2023, Llion left Google Japan to found the startup Sakana AI along with former Google employee and Stability AI officer David Ha, becoming its chief technology officer, also joined by Ren Ito.

Jones has criticized the narrow scope of AI research, such as Google's limited focus on large language models.

== Awards ==
- Honorary Doctorate from Bangor University in 2026 for outstanding scholarship and innovation
