= Babel program =

Speech recognition technology for noisy telephone conversations

The IARPA Babel program developed speech recognition technology for noisy telephone conversations. The main goal of the program was to improve the performance of keyword search on languages with very little transcribed data, i.e. low-resource languages. Data from 26 languages was collected with certain languages being held-out as "surprise" languages to test the ability of the teams to rapidly build a system for a new language.

Beginning in 2012, two industry-led teams (IBM and BBN) and two university-led teams (ICSI led by Nelson Morgan and CMU) participated. The IBM team included University of Cambridge and RWTH Aachen University, while BBN's team included Brno University of Technology, Johns Hopkins University, MIT and LIMSI. Only BBN and IBM made it to the final evaluation campaign in 2016, in which BBN won by achieving the highest keyword search accuracy on the evaluation language.

Some of the funding from Babel was used to further develop the Kaldi toolkit. The speech data was later made available through the Linguistic Data Consortium at a symbolic cost of US$25 per language pack.
