= Distributed Language Translation =

Esperanto-based machine translation project

Distributed Language Translation (Esperanto: Distribuita Lingvo-Tradukado, DLT) was a project to develop an interlingual machine translation system for twelve European languages. It ran between 1985 and 1990.

The distinctive feature of DLT was the use of [a version of] Esperanto as an intermediate language (IL) and the idea that translation could be divided into two stages: from L1 into IL and then from IL into L2. The intermediate translation could be transmitted over a network to any number of workstations which would take care of the translation from IL into the desired language. Since the IL format would have been disambiguated at the source, it could itself serve as a source for further translation without human intervention. — Job M. van Zuijlen (one of the DLT researchers)

DLT was undertaken by the Dutch software house BSO (now part of Atos Origin) in Utrecht in cooperation with the now defunct Dutch airplane manufacturer Fokker and the Universal Esperanto Association.

Modern statistic-based and context-based translation programs are able to produce a better translation.

A prototype application of DLT in technical translation (through 'AECMA Simplified English', in collaboration with Dutch aircraft manufacturer Fokker) achieved an accuracy rate of around 95 percent. Not only the specific technical vocabulary was checked, but also narrow and broad contexts. For more general texts (e.g. reports from UNESCO meetings), the accuracy of the translation was around 50 to 60 percent. BSO failed to attract investment for a further development phase after 1990, and DLT was abandoned unfinished. However, the value of this research project, which according to external experts was very promising, remains in the form of published articles and a whole series of books, detailed and comprehensive enough to support future developments, as if according to the concept of "open source".

== See also ==
- Indigenous Dialogues
