= Greg Corrado =

American computer scientist

- Born: Gregory Corrado
- Education: Princeton University (BA); Stanford University (MS, PhD)
- Known for: Co-founding Google Brain; RankBrain; TensorFlow; word2vec; DistBelief; Med-PaLM
- Awards: NeurIPS Test of Time Award (2023); ICML Ten-Year Award – Honorable Mention (2022)
- Scientific career
- Fields: Computer science; Neuroscience; Artificial intelligence; Machine learning
- Workplaces: Google (2010–present); IBM – T. J. Watson Research Center (2009–2010)
- Thesis: Mathematical models of value-based decision-making in the primate brain (2007)
- Doctoral advisor: William Newsome

Gregory Corrado is an American computer scientist and neuroscientist, known for co-founding the Google Brain in 2011. A Distinguished Scientist at Google, he led the company's Health AI division and oversaw the application of artificial intelligence in healthcare. His work spans AI, computational neuroscience, and large-scale machine learning.

== Early life and education ==
Corrado received a Bachelor of Arts in physics from Princeton University in 1999. He later attended Stanford University, where he earned a Master of Science in computer science and a Ph.D. in neuroscience. His doctoral research focused on systems and computational neuroscience, specializing in the mathematical modeling of value-based decision-making, with concentration in artificial intelligence.

== Career ==
After completing his doctorate, Corrado joined IBM's T. J. Watson Research Center, where he focused on neuromorphic computing and large-scale neural network simulations.

In 2010, Corrado moved to Google and later co-founded Google Brain. Initially a project within the Google X research lab, the team, which included Jeff Dean and Andrew Ng, pioneered the development of large-scale deep learning systems. A major early achievement came in 2012 when the team built a neural network using 16,000 processors that learned to autonomously identify cats from unlabeled YouTube video stills.

At Google, Corrado has been instrumental in integrating AI into consumer products. He helped lead the development of RankBrain, a machine learning system launched in 2015 to improve Google Search results, which Corrado identified as the third most important ranking signal. He also guided the creation of Smart Reply, which uses neural networks to generate automated email responses in Gmail.

Corrado was also involved in the development and open-sourcing of key Google technologies, including the TensorFlow machine learning framework and word2vec, an influential algorithm for creating word embeddings. As co-technical lead, he helped develop DistBelief, the first-generation distributed deep learning infrastructure that preceded TensorFlow.

In the late 2010s, Corrado shifted his focus to the application of artificial intelligence in medicine, eventually becoming Head of Health AI at Google Research in 2016. In this role, he led research into using AI for medical diagnostics, particularly in medical imaging, predicting clinical outcomes, and analyzing genomic and sensor data. Under his leadership, the Health AI team developed several notable projects. These include the Automated Retinal Disease Assessment (ARDA), a tool designed for detecting diabetic retinopathy, and the Med-PaLM series of medical large language models. The initial Med-PaLM model demonstrated the ability to pass U.S. Medical Licensing Examination-style questions, while its successor, Med-PaLM 2, achieved 86.5% accuracy on the MedQA benchmark. Another multimodal model, Med-Gemini, reached 91.1% accuracy on the same benchmark.

== Selected publications ==
- Mikolov, Tomas; Chen, Kai; Corrado, Greg S.; Dean, Jeffrey (2013). "Efficient estimation of word representations in vector space". arXiv:1301.3781 [cs.CL].
- Mikolov, Tomas; Sutskever, Ilya; Chen, Kai; Corrado, Greg S.; Dean, Jeffrey (2013). "Distributed representations of words and phrases and their compositionality". Advances in Neural Information Processing Systems. 26: 3111–3119. arXiv:1310.4546.
- Abadi, Martín; Agarwal, Ashish; Barham, Paul; et al. (2016). "TensorFlow: Large-scale machine learning on heterogeneous distributed systems". arXiv:1603.04467 [cs.DC].
- Wu, Yonghui; Schuster, Mike; Chen, Zhifeng; Le, Quoc V.; et al. (2016). "Google's neural machine translation system: Bridging the gap between human and machine translation". arXiv:1609.08144 [cs.CL].
- Dean, Jeffrey; Corrado, Greg S.; Monga, Rajat; Chen, Kai; et al. (2012). "Large scale distributed deep networks". Advances in Neural Information Processing Systems. 25: 1232–1240.

== Awards and recognition ==
In 2023, Corrado was a recipient of the NeurIPS Test of Time Award for his co-authorship of the 2013 paper that introduced word2vec. Additionally, his work on the 2012 Google Brain project, which pioneered large-scale unsupervised learning, received an ICML Ten-Year Award Honorable Mention in 2022.
