= Google Neural Machine Translation =

System developed by Google

Google Neural Machine Translation (GNMT) is a discontinued neural machine translation (NMT) system developed by Google and introduced in November 2016 that used an artificial neural network to increase fluency and accuracy in Google Translate. The neural network consisted of two main blocks, an encoder and a decoder, both of LSTM architecture with 8 1024-wide layers each and a simple 1-layer 1024-wide feedforward attention mechanism connecting them. The total number of parameters has been variously described as over 160 million, approximately 210 million, 278 million or 380 million. It used WordPiece tokenizer, and beam search decoding strategy. It ran on Tensor Processing Units.

By 2020, the system had been replaced by another deep learning system based on a Transformer encoder and an RNN decoder.

GNMT improved on the quality of translation by applying an example-based (EBMT) machine translation method in which the system learns from millions of examples of language translation. GNMT's proposed architecture of system learning was first tested on over a hundred languages supported by Google Translate. With the large end-to-end framework, the system learns over time to create better, more natural translations. GNMT attempts to translate whole sentences at a time, rather than just piece by piece. The GNMT network can undertake interlingual machine translation by encoding the semantics of the sentence, rather than by memorizing phrase-to-phrase translations.

== History ==
The Google Brain project was established in 2011 in the "secretive Google X research lab" by Google Fellow Jeff Dean, Google Researcher Greg Corrado, and Stanford University Computer Science professor Andrew Ng. Ng's work has led to some of the biggest breakthroughs at Google and Stanford.

In November 2016, Google Neural Machine Translation system (GNMT) was introduced. Since then, Google Translate began using neural machine translation (NMT) in preference to its previous statistical methods (SMT) which had been used since October 2007, with its proprietary, in-house SMT technology.

Training GNMT was a big effort at the time and took, by a 2018 OpenAI estimate, on the order of 79 petaFLOP-days (or 7e21 FLOPs) of compute which was 1.5 orders of magnitude larger than Seq2seq model of 2014 (but about 2x smaller than GPT-J-6B in 2021).

Google Translate's NMT system uses a large artificial neural network capable of deep learning. By using millions of examples, GNMT improves the quality of translation, using broader context to deduce the most relevant translation. The result is then rearranged and adapted to approach grammatically based human language. GNMT's proposed architecture of system learning was first tested on over a hundred languages supported by Google Translate. GNMT did not create its own universal interlingua but rather aimed at finding the commonality between many languages using insights from psychology and linguistics. The new translation engine was first enabled for eight languages: to and from English and French, German, Spanish, Portuguese, Chinese, Japanese, Korean and Turkish in November 2016. In March 2017, three additional languages were enabled: Russian, Hindi and Vietnamese along with Thai for which support was added later. Support for Hebrew and Arabic was also added with help from the Google Translate Community in the same month. In mid April 2017 Google Netherlands announced support for Dutch and other European languages related to English. Further support was added for nine Indian languages: Hindi, Bengali, Marathi, Gujarati, Punjabi, Tamil, Telugu, Malayalam and Kannada at the end of April 2017.

By 2020, Google had changed methodology to use a different neural network system based on transformers, and had phased out NMT.

== Evaluation ==
The GNMT system was said to represent an improvement over the former Google Translate in that it will be able to handle "zero-shot translation", that is it directly translates one language into another. For example, it might be trained just for Japanese-English and Korean-English translation, but can perform Japanese-Korean translation. The system appears to have learned to produce a language-independent intermediate representation of language (an "interlingua"), which allows it to perform zero-shot translation by converting from and to the interlingua. Google Translate previously first translated the source language into English and then translated the English into the target language rather than translating directly from one language to another.

A July 2019 study in Annals of Internal Medicine found that "Google Translate is a viable, accurate tool for translating non–English-language trials". Only one disagreement between reviewers reading machine-translated trials was due to a translation error. Since many medical studies are excluded from systematic reviews because the reviewers do not understand the language, GNMT has the potential to reduce bias and improve accuracy in such reviews.

== Languages supported by GNMT ==
As of December 2021, all of the languages of Google Translate support GNMT, with Latin being the most recent addition.

1. Afrikaans
2. Albanian
3. Amharic
4. Arabic
5. Armenian
6. Azerbaijani
7. Basque
8. Belarusian
9. Bengali
10. Bosnian
11. Bulgarian
12. Burmese
13. Catalan
14. Cebuano
15. Chewa
16. Chinese (Simplified)
17. Chinese (Traditional)
18. Corsican
19. Croatian
20. Czech
21. Danish
22. Dutch
23. English
24. Esperanto
25. Estonian
26. Filipino (Tagalog)
27. Finnish
28. French
29. Galician
30. Georgian
31. German
32. Greek
33. Gujarati
34. Haitian Creole
35. Hausa
36. Hawaiian
37. Hebrew
38. Hindi
39. Hmong
40. Hungarian
41. Icelandic
42. Igbo
43. Indonesian
44. Irish
45. Italian
46. Japanese
47. Javanese
48. Kannada
49. Kazakh
50. Khmer
51. Kinyarwanda
52. Korean
53. Kurdish (Kurmanji)
54. Kyrgyz
55. Lao
56. Latin
57. Latvian
58. Lithuanian
59. Luxembourgish
60. Macedonian
61. Malagasy
62. Malay
63. Malayalam
64. Maltese
65. Maori
66. Marathi
67. Mongolian
68. Nepali
69. Norwegian (Bokmål)
70. Odia
71. Pashto
72. Persian
73. Polish
74. Portuguese
75. Punjabi (Gurmukhi)
76. Romanian
77. Russian
78. Samoan
79. Scottish Gaelic
80. Serbian
81. Shona
82. Sindhi
83. Sinhala
84. Slovak
85. Slovenian
86. Somali
87. Sotho
88. Spanish
89. Sundanese
90. Swahili
91. Swedish
92. Tajik
93. Tamil
94. Tatar
95. Telugu
96. Thai
97. Turkish
98. Turkmen
99. Ukrainian
100. Urdu
101. Uyghur
102. Uzbek
103. Vietnamese
104. Welsh
105. West Frisian
106. Xhosa
107. Yiddish
108. Yoruba
109. Zulu

== See also ==
- Example-based machine translation
- Rule-based machine translation
- Comparison of machine translation applications
- Statistical machine translation
- Artificial intelligence
- Cache language model
- Computational linguistics
- Computer-assisted translation
- History of machine translation
- List of emerging technologies
- List of research laboratories for machine translation
- Neural machine translation
- Machine translation
- Universal translator
