= Pivot language =

Intermediary language between different languages

A pivot language, sometimes also called a bridge language, is an artificial or natural language used as an intermediary language for translation between many different languages – to translate between any pair of languages A and B, one translates A to the pivot language P, then from P to B. Using a pivot language avoids the combinatorial explosion of having translators across every combination of the supported languages, as the number of combinations of language is linear ($n-1$), rather than quadratic $\left(\textstyle{\binom{n}{2}}=\frac{n^2-n}{2}\right)$ – one need only know the language A and the pivot language P (and someone else the language B and the pivot P), rather than needing a different translator for every possible combination of A and B.

The disadvantage of a pivot language is that each step of retranslation introduces possible mistakes and ambiguities – using a pivot language involves two steps, rather than one. For example, when Hernán Cortés communicated with Mesoamerican Indians, he spoke Spanish to Gerónimo de Aguilar, who spoke Mayan to Malintzin, who spoke Nahuatl to the locals.

== Examples ==
English, French, Russian, and Arabic are often used as pivot languages. Interlingua has been used as a pivot language in international conferences and has been proposed as a pivot language for the European Union. Esperanto was proposed as a pivot language in the Distributed Language Translation project and has been used in this way in the Majstro Tradukvortaro at the Esperanto website Majstro.com. The Universal Networking Language is an artificial language specifically designed for use as a pivot language.

== In computing ==
Pivot coding is also a common method of translating data for computer systems. For example, the Internet Protocol, XML and high level languages are pivot codings of computer data which are then often rendered into internal binary formats for particular computer systems.

Unicode was designed to be usable as a pivot coding between various major existing character encodings, though its widespread adoption as a coding in its own right has made this usage unimportant.
