= Deep Learning Studio =

Software tool

- Developer: Deep Cognition Inc.
- Written in: Python
- Operating system: Microsoft Windows, Ubuntu Linux
- Type: Deep learning
- License: Proprietary software
- Website: deeplearningstudio.com

Deep Learning Studio is a software tool that aims to simplify the creation of deep learning models used in artificial intelligence. It is compatible with a number of open-source programming frameworks popularly used in artificial neural networks, including MXNet and Google's TensorFlow.

Prior to the release of Deep Learning Studio in January 2017, proficiency in Python, among other programming languages, was essential in developing effective deep learning models. Deep Learning Studio sought to simplify the model creation process through a visual, drag-and-drop interface and the application of pre-trained learning models on available data.

Irving, Texas–based Deep Cognition Inc. is the developer behind Deep Learning Studio. In 2017, the software allowed Deep Cognition to become a finalist for Best Innovation in Deep Learning in the Alconics Awards, which are given annually to the best artificial intelligence software.

Deep Cognition launched version 2.0 of Deep Learning Studio at NVIDIA's GTC 2018 Conference in San Jose, California.

Fremont, California–based computing products supplier Exxact Corp provides desktop computers specifically built to handle Deep Learning Studio workloads.

== Features ==
Deep Learning Studio is available in two versions: Desktop and Cloud, both of which are free software. The Desktop version is available on Windows and Ubuntu. The Cloud version is available in single-user and multi-user configurations. A Deep Cognition account is needed to access the Cloud version. Account registration is free.

Deep Learning Studio can import existing Keras models; it also takes a data set as an input.

Deep Learning Studio's AutoML feature allows automatic generation of deep learning models. More advanced users may choose to generate their own models using various types of layers and neural networks.

Deep Learning Studio also has a library of loss functions and optimizers for use in hyperparameter tuning, a traditionally complicated area in neural network programming.

Generated models can be trained using either CPUs or GPUs. Trained models can then be used for predictive analytics.

== See also ==
- Artificial intelligence
- Artificial neural network
- Data mining
- Deep learning
- Machine learning
- Predictive analytics
