= Comparison of deep learning software =

Tabular comparison of deep learning software

The following tables compare notable software frameworks, libraries, and computer programs for deep learning applications.

== Deep learning software by name ==
Software	Creator	Initial release	Software license (Note: Licenses here are a summary, and are not taken to be complete statements of the licenses. Some libraries may use other libraries internally under different licenses)	Open source	Platform	Written in	Interface	OpenMP support	OpenCL support	CUDA support	ROCm support	Automatic differentiation	Has pretrained models	Recurrent nets	Convolutional nets	RBM/DBNs	Parallel execution (multi node)	Actively developed
BigDL	Jason Dai (Intel)	2016	Apache 2.0	Yes	Apache Spark	Scala	Scala, Python			No	No		Yes	Yes	Yes			Yes
Caffe	Berkeley Vision and Learning Center	2013	BSD	Yes	Linux, macOS, Windows	C++	Python, MATLAB, C++	Yes	Under development	Yes	No	Yes	Yes	Yes	Yes	No	?	No
Chainer	Preferred Networks	2015	BSD	Yes	Linux, macOS	Python	Python	No	No	Yes	No	Yes	Yes	Yes	Yes	No	Yes	No
Deeplearning4j	Skymind engineering team; Deeplearning4j community; originally Adam Gibson	2014	Apache 2.0	Yes	Linux, macOS, Windows, Android (Cross-platform)	C++, Java	Java, Scala, Clojure, Python (Keras), Kotlin	Yes	No	Yes	No	Computational Graph	Yes	Yes	Yes	Yes	Yes	Yes
Deep Learning Studio	Deep Cognition	2017	Proprietary	No	Windows, Ubuntu	Python	GUI	?	?	Yes	No	Yes	Yes	Yes	Yes	?	Multi-GPU	No
DeepSpeed	Microsoft	2019	Apache 2.0	Yes	Linux, macOS, Windows	Python, C++, CUDA	Python	No	No	Yes	No	Yes	Yes	Yes	Yes	No	Yes	Yes
Dlib	Davis King	2002	Boost Software License	Yes	Cross-platform	C++	C++, Python	Yes	No	Yes	No	Yes	Yes	No	Yes	Yes	Yes	Yes
Fastai	fast.ai	2018	Apache 2.0	Yes	Linux, macOS, Windows	Python, CUDA	Python	No	No	Yes	No	Yes	Yes	Yes	Yes	No	Yes	Yes
Flux	Mike Innes	2017	MIT	Yes	Linux, macOS, Windows (Cross-platform)	Julia	Julia			Yes	No	Yes	Yes	Yes	Yes	No	Yes	Yes
Horovod	Uber Technologies	2017	Apache 2.0	Yes	Linux, macOS, Windows	Python, C++, CUDA	Python	No	No	Yes	No	Yes	Yes	Yes	Yes	No	Yes	Yes
Hugging Face Transformers	Hugging Face	2018	Apache 2.0	Yes	Linux, macOS, Windows	Python	Python	Via PyTorch	No	Via PyTorch	Via PyTorch	Via PyTorch	Yes	Yes	Yes	No	Yes	Yes
Intel Data Analytics Acceleration Library	Intel	2015	Apache 2.0	Yes	Linux, macOS, Windows on Intel CPU	C++, Python, Java	C++, Python, Java	Yes	No	No	No	Yes	No		Yes		Yes	Yes
Intel Math Kernel Library 2017 and later	Intel	2017	Proprietary	No	Linux, macOS, Windows on Intel CPU	C/C++, DPC++, Fortran	C	Yes	No	No	No	Yes	No	Yes	Yes		No	Yes
Google JAX	Google	2018	Apache 2.0	Yes	Linux, macOS, Windows	Python	Python			Only on Linux	No	Yes	No				Yes	Yes
Keras	François Chollet	2015	MIT	Yes	Linux, macOS, Windows	Python	Python, R	Only if using Theano as backend	Can use Theano, Tensorflow or PlaidML as backends	Yes	No	Yes	Yes	Yes	Yes	No	Yes	Yes
MATLAB + Deep Learning Toolbox (formerly Neural Network Toolbox)	MathWorks	1992	Proprietary	No	Linux, macOS, Windows	C, C++, Java, MATLAB	MATLAB	No	No	Train with Parallel Computing Toolbox and generate CUDA code with GPU Coder	No	Yes	Yes	Yes	Yes	Yes	With Parallel Computing Toolbox	Yes
Microsoft Cognitive Toolkit (CNTK)	Microsoft Research	2016	MIT	Yes	Windows, Linux (macOS via Docker on roadmap)	C++	Python (Keras), C++, Command line, BrainScript (.NET on roadmap)	Yes	No	Yes	No	Yes	Yes	Yes	Yes	No	Yes	No
MindSpore	Huawei	2020	Apache 2.0	Yes	Linux, Windows, macOS, EulerOS, openEuler, OpenHarmony, Oniro OS, HarmonyOS, Android	C++, Rust, Julia, Python, ArkTS, Cangjie, Java (Lite)												
ML.NET	Microsoft	2018	MIT	Yes	Windows, Linux, macOS	C#, C++	C#, F#											Yes
Apache MXNet	Apache Software Foundation	2015	Apache 2.0	Yes	Linux, macOS, Windows, AWS, Android, iOS, JavaScript	Small C++ core library	C++, Python, Julia, MATLAB, JavaScript, Go, R, Scala, Perl, Clojure	Yes	No	Yes	No	Yes	Yes	Yes	Yes	Yes	Yes	No
Neural Designer	Artelnics	2014	Proprietary	No	Linux, macOS, Windows	C++	Graphical user interface	Yes	No	Yes	No	Analytical differentiation	No	No	No	No	Yes	Yes
OpenNN	Artelnics	2003	GNU LGPL	Yes	Cross-platform	C++	C++	Yes	No	Yes	No	?	Yes	No	No	No	?	Yes
OpenVINO	Intel	2018	Apache 2.0	Yes	Linux, macOS, Windows	C++, Python	C++, C, Python, JavaScript	Yes	Yes	No	No	No	Yes	Yes	Yes	No	No	Yes
PlaidML	Vertex.AI, Intel	2017	Apache 2.0	Yes	Linux, macOS, Windows	Python, C++, OpenCL	Python, C++	?	Some OpenCL ICDs are not recognized	No	No	Yes	Yes	Yes	Yes		Yes	Yes
PyTorch	Meta AI	2016	BSD	Yes	Linux, macOS, Windows, Android	Python, C, C++, CUDA	Python, C++, Julia, R	Yes	Via separately maintained package	Yes	Yes	Yes	Yes	Yes	Yes	Yes	Yes	Yes
PyTorch Lightning	Lightning-AI (originally William Falcon)	2019	Apache 2.0	Yes	Linux, macOS, Windows	Python	Python	Yes	Via PyTorch	Yes	Yes	Yes	Yes	Yes	Yes	Yes	Yes	Yes
Apache SINGA	Apache Software Foundation	2015	Apache 2.0	Yes	Linux, macOS, Windows	C++	Python, C++, Java	No	Supported in V1.0	Yes	No	?	Yes	Yes	Yes	Yes	Yes	Yes
TensorFlow	Google Brain	2015	Apache 2.0	Yes	Linux, macOS, Windows, Android	C++, Python, CUDA	Python (Keras), C/C++, Java, Go, JavaScript, R, Julia, Swift	No	On roadmap but already with SYCL support	Yes	Yes	Yes	Yes	Yes	Yes	Yes	Yes	Yes
TensorRT	Nvidia	2017	Proprietary	No	Linux, Windows on Nvidia GPUs	C++, Python, CUDA	C++, Python	No	No	Yes	No	No	No	No	Yes	No	No	Yes
Theano	Université de Montréal	2007	BSD	Yes	Cross-platform	Python	Python (Keras)	Yes	Under development	Yes	No	Yes	Through Lasagne's model zoo	Yes	Yes	Yes	Yes	No
Torch	Ronan Collobert, Koray Kavukcuoglu, Clement Farabet	2002	BSD	Yes	Linux, macOS, Windows, Android, iOS	C, Lua	Lua, LuaJIT, C, utility library for C++/OpenCL	Yes	Third party implementations	Yes	No	Through Twitter's Autograd	Yes	Yes	Yes	Yes	Yes	No
RANT (Real-time Artificial Neural Tool)	Douglas Santry	2023	BSD	Yes	Linux, macOS, Windows	C++, Python	C++, Python	No	No	No	No	No	Yes	No	Yes	No	No	Yes
Wolfram Mathematica 10 and later	Wolfram Research	2014	Proprietary	No	Windows, macOS, Linux, Cloud computing	C++, Wolfram Language, CUDA	Wolfram Language	Yes	No	Yes	No	Yes	Yes	Yes	Yes	Yes	Yes	Yes
Software	Creator	Initial release	Software license	Open source	Platform	Written in	Interface	OpenMP support	OpenCL support	CUDA support	ROCm support	Automatic differentiation	Has pretrained models	Recurrent nets	Convolutional nets	RBM/DBNs	Parallel execution (multi node)	Actively developed

== Comparison of machine learning model compatibility ==
Format name	Design goal	Compatible with other formats	Self-contained DNN Model	Pre-processing and Post-processing	Run-time configuration for tuning & calibration	DNN model interconnect	Common platform
TensorFlow, Keras, Caffe, Torch	Algorithm training	No	No / Separate files in most formats	No	No	No	Yes
ONNX	Algorithm training	Yes	No / Separate files in most formats	No	No	No	Yes

== See also ==
- Comparison of statistical packages
- Comparison of cognitive architectures
- Lists of open-source artificial intelligence software
- List of datasets for machine-learning research
- List of numerical-analysis software
- Mamba – deep learning architecture based on selective state-space models
- MLIR compiler — sub-project of the LLVM designed for machine learning, hardware acceleration, and high-level synthesis.
- tinygrad — being developed by George Hotz
