= Kubeflow =

Open-source machine learning platform

- Original author: Google
- Developers: Kubeflow Contributors - AWS, Bloomberg, Google, IBM, Nvidia, Nutanix, Red Hat, Arrikto, and others
- Release: April 5, 2018; 8 years ago
- Stable release: 26.03 / March 22, 2026; 4 months ago
- Written in: Go, Python, TypeScript
- Platform: Kubernetes
- Type: Machine Learning Platform
- License: Apache License 2.0
- Website: kubeflow.org
- Repository: github.com/kubeflow

Kubeflow is an open-source platform for machine learning and MLOps on Kubernetes introduced by Google. The different stages in a typical machine learning lifecycle are represented with different software components in Kubeflow, including model development (Kubeflow Notebooks), model training (Kubeflow Pipelines, Kubeflow Training Operator), model serving (KServe (Note: KServe was previously known as KFServing)), and automated machine learning (Katib).

Each component of Kubeflow can be deployed separately, and it is not a requirement to deploy every component.

== History ==
The Kubeflow project was first announced at KubeCon + CloudNativeCon North America 2017 by Google engineers David Aronchick, Jeremy Lewi, and Vishnu Kannan to address a perceived lack of flexible options for building production-ready machine learning systems. The project has also stated it began as a way for Google to open-source how they ran TensorFlow internally.

The first release of Kubeflow (Kubeflow 0.1) was announced at KubeCon + CloudNativeCon Europe 2018. Kubeflow 1.0 was released in March 2020 via a public blog post announcing that many Kubeflow components were graduating to a "stable status", indicating they were now ready for production usage.

In October 2022, Google announced that the Kubeflow project had applied to join the Cloud Native Computing Foundation. In July 2023, the foundation voted to accept Kubeflow as an incubating stage project.

== Components ==
=== Kubeflow Notebooks for model development ===
Machine learning models are developed in the notebooks component called Kubeflow Notebooks. The component runs web-based development environments inside a Kubernetes cluster, with native support for Jupyter Notebook, Visual Studio Code, and RStudio.

=== Kubeflow Pipelines for model training ===
Once developed, models are trained in the Kubeflow Pipelines component. The component acts as a platform for building and deploying portable, scalable machine learning workflows based on Docker containers. Google Cloud Platform has adopted the Kubeflow Pipelines DSL within its Vertex AI Pipelines product.

=== Kubeflow Training Operator for model training ===
For certain machine learning models and libraries, the Kubeflow Training Operator component provides Kubernetes custom resources support. The component runs distributed or non-distributed TensorFlow, PyTorch, Apache MXNet, XGBoost, and MPI training jobs on Kubernetes.

=== KServe for model serving ===
The KServe component (previously named KFServing) provides Kubernetes custom resources for serving machine learning models on arbitrary frameworks including TensorFlow, XGBoost, scikit-learn, PyTorch, and ONNX. KServe was developed collaboratively by Google, IBM, Bloomberg, NVIDIA, and Seldon. Publicly disclosed adopters of KServe include Bloomberg, Gojek, the Wikimedia Foundation, and others.

=== Katib for automated machine learning ===
Lastly, Kubeflow includes a component for automated training and development of machine learning models, the Katib component. It is described as a Kubernetes-native project and features hyperparameter tuning, early stopping, and neural architecture search.

== Release timeline ==
Release timeline
Version	Release date	Release Information	Release Blog
Kubeflow 0.1	5 April, 2018	-	https://kubernetes.io/blog/2018/05/04/announcing-kubeflow-0.1/
Kubeflow 0.2	2 July, 2018	-	https://medium.com/kubeflow/kubeflow-0-2-offers-new-components-and-simplified-setup-735e4c56988d
Kubeflow 0.3	5 October, 2018	-	https://medium.com/kubeflow/kubeflow-0-3-simplifies-setup-improves-ml-development-98b8ca10bd69
Kubeflow 0.4	8 January, 2019	-	https://medium.com/kubeflow/kubeflow-0-4-release-enhancements-for-machine-learning-productivity-d77c54df07a9
Kubeflow 0.5	9 April, 2019	-	https://medium.com/kubeflow/kubeflow-v0-5-simplifies-model-development-with-enhanced-ui-and-fairing-library-78e19cdc9f50
Kubeflow 0.6	19 July, 2019	https://www.kubeflow.org/docs/releases/kubeflow-0.6/	https://medium.com/kubeflow/kubeflow-v0-6-a-robust-foundation-for-artifact-tracking-data-versioning-multi-user-support-9896d329412c
Kubeflow 0.7	17 October, 2019	https://www.kubeflow.org/docs/releases/kubeflow-0.7/	https://medium.com/kubeflow/kubeflow-v0-7-delivers-beta-functionality-in-the-leadup-to-v1-0-1e63036c07b8
Kubeflow 1.0	20 February, 2020	https://www.kubeflow.org/docs/releases/kubeflow-1.0/	https://blog.kubeflow.org/releases/2020/03/02/kubeflow-1-0-cloud-native-ml-for-everyone
Kubeflow 1.1	31 July, 2020	https://www.kubeflow.org/docs/releases/kubeflow-1.1/	https://blog.kubeflow.org/release/official/2020/07/31/kubeflow-1.1-blog-post
Kubeflow 1.2	18 November, 2020	https://www.kubeflow.org/docs/releases/kubeflow-1.2/	https://blog.kubeflow.org/release/official/2020/11/18/kubeflow-1.2-blog-post
Kubeflow 1.3	23 April, 2021	https://www.kubeflow.org/docs/releases/kubeflow-1.3/	https://blog.kubeflow.org/kubeflow-1.3-release/
Kubeflow 1.4	12 October, 2021	https://www.kubeflow.org/docs/releases/kubeflow-1.4/	https://blog.kubeflow.org/kubeflow-1.4-release/
Kubeflow 1.5	10 March, 2022	https://www.kubeflow.org/docs/releases/kubeflow-1.5/	https://blog.kubeflow.org/kubeflow-1.5-release/
Kubeflow 1.6	7 September, 2022	https://www.kubeflow.org/docs/releases/kubeflow-1.6/	https://blog.kubeflow.org/kubeflow-1.6-release/
Kubeflow 1.7	29 March, 2023	https://www.kubeflow.org/docs/releases/kubeflow-1.7/	https://blog.kubeflow.org/kubeflow-1.7-release/
Kubeflow 1.8	1 November, 2023	https://www.kubeflow.org/docs/releases/kubeflow-1.8/	https://blog.kubeflow.org/kubeflow-1.8-release/
Kubeflow 1.9	22 July, 2024	https://www.kubeflow.org/docs/releases/kubeflow-1.9/	https://blog.kubeflow.org/kubeflow-1.9-release/
Kubeflow 1.10	1 April, 2025	https://www.kubeflow.org/docs/releases/kubeflow-1.10/	https://blog.kubeflow.org/kubeflow-1.10-release/
Kubeflow 1.11	15 December, 2025	https://www.kubeflow.org/docs/releases/kubeflow-1.11/	https://blog.kubeflow.org/kubeflow-1.11-release/
Kubeflow 26.03	22 March, 2026	https://www.kubeflow.org/docs/releases/kubeflow-26.03/	https://blog.kubeflow.org/kubeflow-26.03-release/
