= List of Julia software and tools =

Julia software and development tools

This is a list of Julia software and tools, including IDEs, notebook environments, package management tools, scientific and machine-learning libraries, debugging and performance tools, and related projects.

== Integrated development environments and editors ==
- Visual Studio Code — supports Julia through the official Julia extension, which provides a full IDE experience including LSP, REPL integration, debugging, profiling, plotting, etc. It can be combined with an Emacs keymap or Vim extension, or with vscode-neovim for full embedded Neovim instance.
- JetBrains — supports Julia through the Flexible Julia plugin for JetBrains IDEs
- Emacs — supports Julia through major modes and related packages, such as julia-mode, julia-repl, and Eglot configured for Julia's LanguageServer.jl
- Neovim — supports Julia development through plugins and language-server integration.
- Vim — supports Julia editing through syntax highlighting, plugins, and language-server integration. Neovim generally offers a richer and more modern extensibility/integration environment.
- Zed — has a JuliaEditorSupport extension providing language-server support, REPL/tasks, and a plot pane.
- Sublime Text — supports Julia through syntax highlighting and Julia-related packages
- Atom — formerly supported for Julia development through Juno
- Juno — a Julia-focused IDE built on Atom
- JuliaPro (discontinued) — a former Julia distribution bundled with development tools

== Notebook environments ==
- Jupyter — web-based notebook environment with Julia support
- Pluto.jl — reactive notebook environment for Julia
- Google Colab — cloud notebook platform with Julia support
- Quarto — scientific and technical publishing system with Julia support

== Package management and build tools ==
- Pkg — built-in package manager for Julia
- JuliaHub — platform for package, project, and cloud-based Julia workflows
- PackageCompiler.jl — compiler tool for creating apps, libraries, and system images
- StaticCompiler.jl — compiler for producing small standalone binaries from a static subset of Julia
- PrecompileTools.jl — package precompilation tool
- Revise.jl — updates method definitions in a running Julia session

== Debugging and performance tools ==
- Debugger.jl — source-level debugger for Julia
- JuliaInterpreter.jl — interpreter used for debugging and code analysis
- Profile — built-in profiling tool
- BenchmarkTools.jl — benchmarking package for Julia
- JET.jl — static analysis and code analysis tool
- Cthulhu.jl — interactive tool for examining generated code and type inference

== Testing and documentation tools ==
- Test — built-in unit testing standard library
- Documenter.jl — documentation generator for Julia packages
- Literate.jl — tool for writing Julia code as literate programs
- Aqua.jl — package quality-assurance tool for Julia projects

== Scientific computing and mathematics ==
- JuMP — algebraic modeling language for mathematical optimization
- DifferentialEquations.jl — suite for differential equation solving
- Symbolics.jl — symbolic computing library
- ForwardDiff.jl — automatic differentiation package
- Optim.jl — mathematical optimization package
- Roots.jl — numerical root-finding package

== Data science and visualization ==
- DataFrames.jl — tabular data manipulation library
- CSV.jl — package for reading and writing comma-separated values
- Makie.jl — visualization library
- Plots.jl — plotting front end for Julia
- Gadfly.jl — plotting and data visualization package
- AlgebraOfGraphics.jl — grammar-of-graphics-style visualization library

== Machine learning and artificial intelligence ==
- Flux.jl — machine-learning library
- MLJ.jl — machine-learning framework
- Knet.jl — deep-learning framework
- Turing.jl — probabilistic programming library
- BetaML.jl — machine-learning toolkit

== Web and application development ==
- Genie.jl — web framework for Julia
- HTTP.jl — package for HTTP clients and servers
- Oxygen.jl — web framework for building APIs and web applications
- Dash.jl — Julia interface for Dash applications

== Interoperability tools ==
- PythonCall.jl — interoperability package for Python and Julia
- PyCall.jl — interface for calling Python from Julia (older than the modern PythonCall.jl)
- JuliaLibWrapping.jl — a tool for turning Julia packages into shared libraries with C and Python interfaces (or more "R and Matlab are likely to follow soon") Builds on JuliaC.jl, to compile to small binaries.
- RCall.jl — interface for calling R from Julia
- JavaCall.jl — interface for calling Java
- CxxWrap.jl — interoperability package for C++
- MATLAB.jl — interface for MATLAB

== See also ==
- Julia (programming language)
- List of numerical-analysis software
- List of data science software
- Lists of programming software development tools
