= DeepSpeed =

Microsoft open source library

- Original author: Microsoft Research
- Developer: Microsoft
- Release: May 18, 2020; 6 years ago
- Stable release: v0.19.9 / October 29, 2026; 9 days ago
- Written in: Python, CUDA, C++
- Type: Software library
- License: Apache License 2.0
- Website: deepspeed.ai
- Repository: github.com/microsoft/DeepSpeed

DeepSpeed' is an open-source optimization library for the distributed training and inference of deep learning models using PyTorch.

== Library ==
The library is designed to reduce computing power and memory use and to train large distributed models with better parallelism on existing computer hardware. DeepSpeed is optimized for low latency, high throughput training. It includes the Zero Redundancy Optimizer (ZeRO) for training models with 1 trillion or more parameters. Features include mixed precision training, single-GPU, multi-GPU, and multi-node training as well as custom model parallelism. The DeepSpeed source code is licensed under Apache License and available on GitHub.

The team claimed to achieve up to a 6.2x throughput improvement, 2.8x faster convergence, and 4.6x less communication.

== See also ==
- Comparison of deep learning software
- Deep learning
- Machine learning
- TensorFlow
