= BigDL =

- Developer: Intel
- Type: Library for deep learning
- License: Apache 2.0
- Website: BigDL: Distributed Deep Learning Library for Apache Spark
- Repository: https://github.com/intel-analytics/BigDL

BigDL is a distributed deep learning framework for Apache Spark, created by Jason Dai at Intel. BigDL has its source code hosted on GitHub.

== Features ==
BigDL is implemented as a library on top of Apache Spark, so deep-learning applications are written as standard Spark programs and can run on existing Hadoop/Spark clusters without a separate GPU cluster. It provides a Torch-like numerical tensor API and high-level neural-network APIs (including a Keras-like interface), supports loading pre-trained Caffe and Torch models, and exposes both Scala and Python interfaces together with Spark ML pipeline integration.

== Applications ==
Because the model runs where the data already resides, BigDL is aimed at end-to-end analytics pipelines: users can load and preprocess large datasets with Spark RDDs, DataFrames or Spark SQL (from HDFS, Hive, HBase or Parquet), feed the distributed dataset into a neural network, and continue with ETL, feature engineering or classical machine learning in the same workflow. The SoCC '19 paper presents production use cases including large-scale text classification, and reports adoption in industry for building deep-learning applications on production big-data platforms.

== See also ==
- Comparison of deep learning software
