= Microsoft Cognitive Toolkit =

Deep learning framework by Microsoft Research

- Developer: Microsoft Research
- Initial release: 25 January 2016; 9 years ago
- Stable release: 2.7.0 / 26 April 2019; 6 years ago
- Repository: github.com/Microsoft/CNTK
- Written in: C++
- Operating system: Windows, Linux
- Type: Library for machine learning and deep learning
- License: MIT License
- Website: www.microsoft.com/en-us/cognitive-toolkit/

Microsoft Cognitive Toolkit, previously known as CNTK and sometimes styled as The Microsoft Cognitive Toolkit, is a deprecated deep learning framework developed by Microsoft Research. Microsoft Cognitive Toolkit describes neural networks as a series of computational steps via a directed graph.

== See also ==
- Comparison of deep learning software
- ML.NET
- Open Neural Network Exchange
