= Neural Designer =

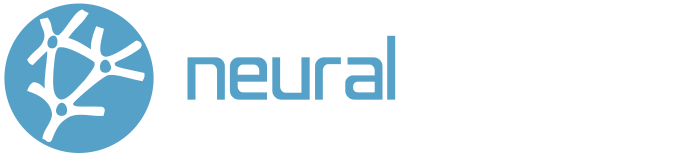
- Developer: Artelnics
- Written in: C++
- Operating system: Microsoft Windows, OS X, Linux
- Type: Data mining, machine learning, predictive analytics
- License: Proprietary software
- Website: www.neuraldesigner.com

Neural Designer is a software tool for machine learning based on neural networks, a main area of artificial intelligence research, and contains a graphical user interface which simplifies data entry and interpretation of results.

In 2015, Neural Designer was chosen by the European Commission, within the Horizon 2020 program, as a disruptive technology in the ICT field.

== Features ==
Neural Designer performs descriptive, diagnostic, predictive and prescriptive data analytics. It implements deep architectures with multiple non-linear layers and contains utilities to solve function regression, pattern recognition, time series and autoencoding problems.

The input to Neural Designer is a data set, and its output is a predictive model. That result takes the form of an explicit mathematical expression, which can be exported to any computer language or system.

== Related tools ==
- Weka: free machine learning and data mining software.
- RapidMiner: free and commercial machine learning framework implemented in Java.
- KNIME: free and commercial machine learning and data mining software.

== See also ==
- Artificial intelligence
- Artificial neural network
- Comparison of deep learning software
- Data mining
- Deep learning
- Machine learning
- Predictive analytics
