= PyTorch Lightning =

Programming library

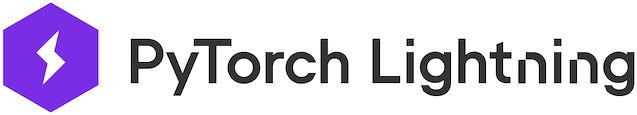
- Original author: William Falcon
- Developer: Various
- Release: May 31, 2019; 7 years ago
- Platform: Cross-platform
- License: Apache License 2.0
- Website: lightning.ai
- Repository: github.com/Lightning-AI/pytorch-lightning

PyTorch Lightning is an open-source Python library that provides a high-level interface for PyTorch, a popular deep learning framework. It is a lightweight and high-performance framework that organizes PyTorch code to decouple research from engineering, thus making deep learning experiments easier to read and reproduce. It is designed to create scalable deep learning models that can easily run on distributed hardware while keeping the models hardware agnostic.

In 2019, Lightning was adopted by the NeurIPS Reproducibility Challenge as a standard for submitting PyTorch code to the conference.

In 2022, the PyTorch Lightning library officially became a part of the Lightning framework, an open-source framework managed by the original creators of PyTorch Lightning.

== See also ==
- Comparison of deep learning software
