= Caffe (software) =

Deep learning framework

- Original author: Yangqing Jia
- Developers: Berkeley Vision and Learning Center
- Stable release: 1.0 / 18 April 2017; 9 years ago
- Written in: C++
- Operating system: Linux, macOS, Windows
- Type: Library for deep learning
- License: BSD
- Website: caffe.berkeleyvision.org
- Repository: github.com/BVLC/caffe

Caffe (Convolutional Architecture for Fast Feature Embedding) is a deep learning framework, originally developed at University of California, Berkeley. It is open source, under a BSD license. It is written in C++, with a Python interface.

== History ==
Yangqing Jia created the Caffe project during his PhD at UC Berkeley, while working the lab of Trevor Darrell. The first version, called "DeCAF", made its first appearance in Spring 2013 when it was used for the ILSVRC challenge (later called ImageNet). The library was named Caffe and released to the public in December 2013. It reached end-of-support in 2018. It is hosted on GitHub.

== Features ==
Caffe supports many different types of deep learning architectures geared towards image classification and image segmentation. It supports CNN, RCNN, LSTM and fully-connected neural network designs. Caffe supports GPU- and CPU-based accelerated computational kernel libraries such as Nvidia cuDNN and Intel MKL.

== Applications ==
Caffe is being used in academic research projects, startup prototypes, and even large-scale industrial applications in vision, speech, and multimedia. Yahoo! has also integrated Caffe with Apache Spark to create CaffeOnSpark, a distributed deep learning framework.

== Caffe2 ==
In April 2017, Facebook announced Caffe2, which included new features such as recurrent neural network (RNN). At the end of March 2018, Caffe2 was merged into PyTorch.

== See also ==
- Comparison of deep learning software
