= Lists of open-source artificial intelligence software =

These lists include projects which release their software under open-source licenses and are related to artificial intelligence projects. These include software libraries, frameworks, platforms, and tools used for machine learning, deep learning, natural language processing, computer vision, reinforcement learning, artificial general intelligence, and more.

== Automated theorem provers ==
- Alt-Ergo
- Automath
- CVC
- E
- IsaPlanner
- LCF
- Mizar
- NuPRL
- Paradox
- Prover9
- PVS
- SPARK (programming language)
- Twelf
- Z3 Theorem Prover

== LLM agents ==
- Auto-GPT — experimental open-source autonomous GPT-based agent
- OpenClaw — autonomous task-executing AI agent
- CrewAI — framework for building and orchestrating multi-agent AI systems
- LangChain — framework for building applications and agents powered by large language models
- Theia AI — framework for integrating AI capabilities and agents into integrated development environments (IDEs).

== AI-assisted software development ==
- Codex CLI – AI coding agent and command-line interface developed by OpenAI.
- Cline – AI coding agent for IDEs and the command line.
- Command Code — CLI and desktop AI agent
- DeepSeek Coder – large language model designed for code generation and AI-assisted software development.
- goose – AI coding agent for the desktop and command line.
- Grok Build – SpaceXAI's terminal-based AI coding agent.
- Hermes Agent – AI coding agent for the command line and IDE extensions.
- Kilo Code — CLI and IDE extension developed by Anaconda
- OpenCode — CLI, desktop app, web app, and IDE extensions
- OpenHands — AI software development agent
- Oh My Pi – terminal-based AI coding agent developed as a fork of Pi.
- Pi – terminal-based AI coding agent.
- Warp – agentic development environment combining a terminal, integrated coding agent, and CLI.
- Zed – source-code editor with integrated AI-assisted development and agentic coding features.

== AI hardware and inference acceleration ==
=== LLM inference and serving frameworks ===
- llama.cpp — library that can perform inference on various LLMs such as Llama, Mistral, Gemma, DeepSeek or Qwen.
- MLX – Apple's ML framework, the MLX LM package provides large language model inference and fine-tuning on Apple silicon.
- SGLang – framework for structured generation and high-performance LLM inference and serving
- vLLM – high-throughput inference engine for large language models using techniques such as PagedAttention
- Ollama – a software platform that enables easy deployment and interaction with many large language models locally.
- Open WebUI — self-hosted web interface for locally running LLMs.

=== Model formats and optimization toolkits ===
- ONNX – Open Neural Network Exchange format for interoperability between AI frameworks
- OpenVINO – Intel's toolkit for optimizing deep learning models for edge devices
- TensorRT-LLM — Nvidia toolkit for optimizing and deploying large language models on GPUs

== Artificial neural networks ==
- EDLUT – event-driven neural network simulator for large-scale spiking networks
- Emergent – cognitive modeling platform implementing neural networks
- Encog – machine learning framework for Java and C# supporting neural networks
- JOONE – Java-based neural network framework with modular architecture for learning tasks
- Nengo – Python library for building and simulating large-scale neural systems
- Neuroph – lightweight Java framework for creating neural networks
- OpenNN – C++ library for designing, training, and deploying neural networks
- SNNS – Stuttgart Neural Network Simulator, supports feedforward and recurrent neural networks

=== Convolutional neural networks (CNNs) ===
- AlexNet — pioneering CNN for image classification, won the 2012 ImageNet competition
- VGGNet — deep CNN known for its simplicity and use of 3x3 convolution filters
- Inception — CNN architecture using parallel convolutional layers of different sizes

=== State-space models ===
- Mamba – selective state-space model architecture for efficient sequence modeling

== Chatbots ==
- LAION OpenAssistant
- Mycroft

== Cognitive architectures and AGI platforms ==
- ACT-R – cognitive architecture for modeling human cognition and developing cognitive agents.
- CLARION – Connectionist Learning with Adaptive Rule Induction On-line, hybrid connectionist/symbolic cognitive architecture.
- OpenCog – project that aims to build an open source artificial intelligence framework
- Soar – cognitive architecture for decision-making and learning in intelligent agents

== Computer vision and image processing ==
- AForge.NET – computer vision, artificial intelligence, and robotics library for the .NET framework
- Dlib – C++ library for computer vision and image processing
- OpenCV — library of programming functions mainly for real-time computer vision
- Point Cloud Library – library for point cloud processing
- Tesseract – optical character recognition

== Deep learning ==
- BigDL – distributed deep learning library for Apache Spark
- Caffe – deep learning framework focused on speed and modularity
- Deeplearning4j – Java library for deep learning algorithms on the Java virtual machine
- DeepSpeed – deep learning optimization library developed by Microsoft
- fastai – deep learning library built on top of PyTorch
- Fast Artificial Neural Network (FANN) – C library for feedforward neural networks
- Horovod – distributed deep learning framework for TensorFlow, Keras, and PyTorch
- Hugging Face Transformers — open-source deep learning library developed by Hugging Face
- Keras – Python library for artificial neural networks
- Microsoft Cognitive Toolkit – deep learning framework developed by Microsoft Research
- MXNet – deep learning framework for training and deploying deep neural networks
- Neuroph – object-oriented artificial neural network framework written in Java
- OpenNN – artificial neural network library written in C++
- PlaidML – deep learning backend for neural networks and tensor computations
- PyTorch – deep learning framework developed by Meta AI
- PyTorch Lightning – high-level framework built on top of PyTorch for organizing and scaling deep learning models
- TensorFlow – end-to-end open-source platform for machine learning and deep learning developed by Google Brain
- Torch – scientific computing framework with support for machine learning and deep learning algorithms

== Machine learning or data mining ==
- Accord.NET — C# framework for machine learning, statistics, computer vision, and signal processing
- Apache Mahout — scalable machine learning library for big data built on Hadoop and Spark
- Apache SINGA — distributed deep learning and machine learning software
- Apache SystemDS — ML system for the end-to-end data science lifecycle
- CatBoost — machine learning library for gradient boosting on decision trees
- Caffe — Image classification and image segmentation
- Dlib — C++ machine learning and computer vision library
- ELKI — data mining and unsupervised learning software
- fastText — Word embeddings developed by Meta AI
- Flux — machine learning library for the Julia programming language
- Gensim — topic modelling and vector space model toolkit
- JAX — machine learning library for numerical computing and automatic differentiation
- H_{2}O — machine learning and predictive analytics platform
- Infer.NET — probabilistic programming framework for Bayesian inference
- Jubatus — online machine learning and distributed computing framework
- KNIME — modular data pipelining
- LIBSVM — library for support vector machines
- LightGBM — machine learning framework for gradient boosting
- Massive Online Analysis — framework for machine learning and data mining on evolving data streams
- Microsoft Cognitive Toolkit — deep learning framework developed by Microsoft Research
- MindSpore — machine learning and deep learning framework
- ML.NET — machine learning framework for .NET
- mlpack — C++ header-only machine learning library
- MLX — machine learning framework for Apple silicon supporting model training, inference, and fine-tuning
- MXNet — deep learning framework
- Orange — machine learning, data mining, data visualization, and data analysis
- PyMC — Python framework for Bayesian modeling and probabilistic programming
- Scikit-learn — library built on top of NumPy, SciPy, and matplotlib
- Scikit-multiflow — Python framework for online and stream machine learning
- Seaborn — Python statistical data visualization library based on matplotlib
- Shogun — C++ library for large-scale machine learning
- Spark MLlib — machine learning library for Apache Spark
- TensorFlow — machine learning and deep learning platform
- Theano — numerical computation library for machine learning
- Vowpal Wabbit — machine learning system for fast online learning
- Weka — collection of machine learning algorithms for data mining tasks
- XGBoost — machine learning library for gradient boosting

=== AutoML platforms ===
- TPOT – tree-based pipeline optimization tool using genetic programming
- Neural Network Intelligence – Microsoft toolkit for hyperparameter tuning and neural architecture search
- MindsDB – AutoML platform that embeds machine learning into SQL databases and applications

== Language models ==
- Apertus – Swiss National AI Initiative LLM
- BERT – Google LLM
- BLOOM – BigScience multilingual LLM
- Cerebras-GPT – Cerebras Systems LLMs
- DeepSeek – R1 and V3 models
- Gemma 4 – Google LLM
- GLM-4.5 and later versions – Z.ai LLMs
- GPT-1, GPT-2, and GPT-OSS – OpenAI LLMs
- GPT-J, GPT-Neo, and GPT-NeoX – EleutherAI LLMs
- Hy – Tencent open-weight LLM
- Granite – IBM LLMs
- Grok-1 – xAI LLM
- Inkling – Thinking Machines
- Kimi (some versions) – Moonshot AI LLMs
- MiMo (some versions) – Xiaomi LLMs
- Mistral (some versions)
- Muse Glimmer — Meta Superintelligence Labs LLM
- Nemotron 3 – Nvidia open-weight models
- OLMo – Allen Institute for AI LLM
- Phi – Microsoft LLMs
- Qwen (some versions) – Alibaba Cloud LLMs
- Sarvam-M, Sarvam-105B and Sarvam-30B – Sarvam AI LLMs
- SmolLM – Hugging Face small language models (SLMs)
- Step-3.7Flash – StepFun LLM
- T5 – Google LLM
- XLNet – Google LLM

== Natural language processing (NLP) ==
- Apache OpenNLP
- Apertium – rule-based machine translation platform.
- ChatScript – natural language engine and dialog management system
- General Architecture for Text Engineering – information extraction
- Gensim – topic modeling and document similarity analysis library
- GloVe – unsupervised learning algorithm for obtaining vector representations of words
- Mallet – Java "Machine Learning for Language Toolkit"
- MontyLingua – libraries and programs for symbolic and statistical NLP for both Python and Java
- Moses – statistical machine translation engine to train statistical models of text from a source language to a target language
- NiuTrans – statistical machine translation
- NLTK – natural Language toolkit for symbolic and statistical NLP
- Probabilistic Action Cores – interpreter for natural-language instructions for robotic applications
- spaCy – Python library
- Spark NLP – text processing library for advanced NLP for Python, Java, and Scala.
- Word2vec – obtaining vector representations of words

=== Speech recognition systems ===
- CMU Sphinx
- DeepSpeech
- Julius
- Whisper

== Reactive planning ==
- GOLOG – logic programming language, situation calculus, first-order logical language for reasoning about action and change.

== Reinforcement learning frameworks ==
- KataGo – reinforcement learning agent designed for playing the game of Go

== Robotics software ==
Operating systems

- BrickOS
- Robot Operating System

Middleware

- OpenRTM-aist
- Player Project

Frameworks and libraries

- leJOS
- Mobile Robot Programming Toolkit
- Python Robotics
- URBI

Simulation

- AirSim
- Asynchronous multi-body framework
- CoppeliaSim
- Gazebo
- MuJoCo
- Simbad robot simulator
- SimSpark
- Webots

Motion planning and control

- OMPL
- OpenRAVE

Perception and tracking

- Point Cloud Library
- SwisTrack

Autonomous vehicles and drones

- ArduPilot
- LibrePilot
- Openpilot
- Paparazzi Project
- PX4 autopilot

Programming languages

- Enchanting
- EusLisp

Educational robotics

- Open Roberta

== Text to image ==
- Flux
- Stable Diffusion

== Text to speech ==
- Festival Speech Synthesis System
- WaveNet
- eSpeak

== Transformer libraries ==
- Hugging Face Transformers – Python library of pretrained transformer models for NLP, computer vision, speech, and more.

== LLM gateways ==
- Bifrost – open-source LLM gateway written in Go that provides an OpenAI-compatible API for routing requests across multiple model providers, with failover and load balancing.
- LiteLLM – LLM gateway that provides a unified OpenAI-compatible API for accessing and routing requests to different model providers.

== AI-assisted algorithm discovery ==
- AlphaTensor – DeepMind reinforcement-learning system for discovering efficient matrix multiplication algorithms

== Music and audio generation ==
- Riffusion – generating music and audio using Stable Diffusion.

== Knowledge bases and knowledge graphs ==
- ConceptNet – multilingual commonsense knowledge graph used in natural-language processing and artificial-intelligence applications.
- DBpedia – project that extracts structured knowledge from Wikipedia using an open-source extraction framework.

== See also ==
- Open-source artificial intelligence
- List of artificial intelligence algorithms
- List of artificial intelligence journals and List of artificial intelligence books
- List of artificial intelligence projects
- List of free and open-source software packages for artificial intelligence
- List of proprietary artificial intelligence software
- Open weights
- Common Crawl – nonprofit that crawls the web and freely provides its archives and datasets to the public under an MIT License
- Google Colab – an O-IDE Jupyter notebook environment with free access to GPUs and TPUs for machine learning and deep learning development
- Applications of artificial intelligence
