= Bitnet =

Bitnet may refer to:

- BitNet (large language model), a 1.58-bit large language model
- BITNET, a computer network
