= JOONE =

Java Object Oriented Neural Engine
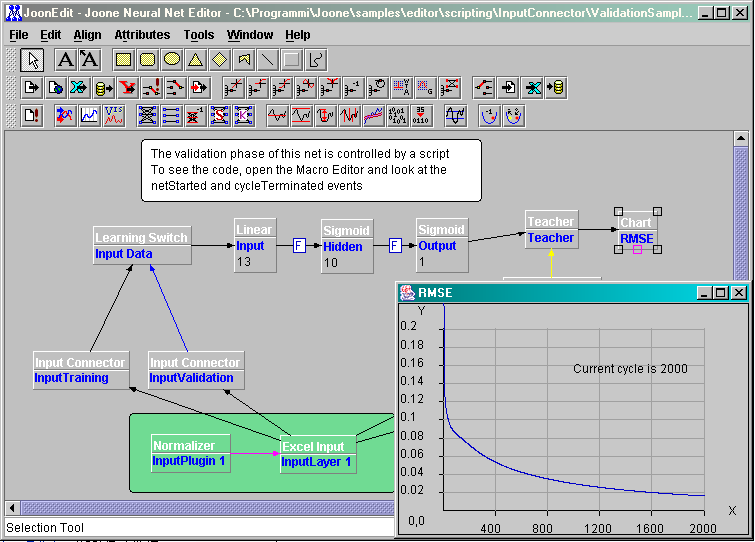
- Screenshot Demonstration of drawing capability in JOONE
- Developer: The Joone Team
- Stable release: 1.2.1 / September 8, 2005
- Preview release: 2.0 RC1 / January 19, 2007
- Written in: Java
- Operating system: Cross-platform
- Type: Neural network software
- License: GPL or LGPL

JOONE (Java Object Oriented Neural Engine) is a component based neural network framework built in Java.

== Features ==
Joone consists of a component-based architecture based on linkable components that can be extended to build new learning algorithms and neural networks architectures.

Components are plug-in code modules that are linked to produce an information flow. New components can be added and reused. Beyond simulation, Joone also has to some extent multi-platform deployment capabilities.

Joone has a GUI Editor to graphically create and test any neural network, and a distributed training environment that allows for neural networks to be trained on multiple remote machines.

== Comparison ==
As of 2010, Joone, Encog and Neuroph are the major free component based neural network development environment available for the Java platform. Unlike the two other (commercial) systems that are in existence, Synapse and NeuroSolutions, it is written in Java and has direct cross-platform support. A limited number of components exist and the graphical development environment is rudimentary so it has significantly fewer features than its commercial counterparts.

Joone can be considered to be more of a neural network framework than a full integrated development environment. Unlike its commercial counterparts, it has a strong focus on code-based development of neural networks rather than visual construction.

While in theory Joone can be used to construct a wider array of adaptive systems (including those with non-adaptive elements), its focus is on backpropagation based neural networks.

== See also ==
- Artificial neural network
- Neural network software
- Encog: another neural network programmed in Java
