= NeuroDimension =

Software company

- Founded: 1991; 35 years ago
- Defunct: August 2016
- Headquarters: Gainesville, Florida, United States
- Products: NeuroSolutions, TradingSolutions

NeuroDimension, Inc. was a software company specializing in artificial neural networks, adaptive systems, and genetic optimization and made software tools for developing and implementing these artificial intelligence technologies. NeuroSolutions is a general-purpose neural network development environment and TradingSolutions is a tool for developing trading systems based on neural networks and genetic algorithms.

NeuroDimension was acquired by nDimensional, Inc. in 2016.

== History ==
=== Formation and NeuroSolutions ===
Prior to the acquisition of NeuroDimension (in 2016), it was a software development company headquartered in Gainesville, Florida and founded in 1991 by Steven Reid, MD, Jose Principe, PhD (Director of the Computational Neural Engineering Lab at the University of Florida) and Curt Lefebvre, PhD (CEO of nDimensional). Dr. Reid provided the initial capital to get the company off the ground. Dr. Principe provided the engineering staff with technical direction and had helped secure research grant funding for the company. Dr. Lefebvre was the principal author of the company's core neural network technology.

The company was formed around a software tool, NeuroSolutions, which enables engineers and researchers to model their data using neural networks.

=== Financial Analysis and TradingSolutions ===
In 1997, it became apparent that one of the most common uses of NeuroSolutions was to create neural network models to time the financial markets.

Released in 2008, Trader68 handles the trading and distribution of trading signals from TradingSolutions, proprietary research, and other sources.

In late 2015, Trader68 was discontinued and is no longer supported or actively developed. TradingSolutions was discontinued in 2016.

=== nDimensional, Inc. Acquires NeuroDimension, Inc. ===
In August 2016, nDimensional, Inc. announced the acquisition of NeuroDimension, Inc. to help accelerate its new web-based Platform-as-a-Service product called nD to market.

== See also ==
- Artificial Intelligence
- Adaptive system
- Embedded system
- Genetic algorithm
- Neural network software
