= Arthur Mensch =

French entrepreneur, AI researcher and startup leader (born 1992)

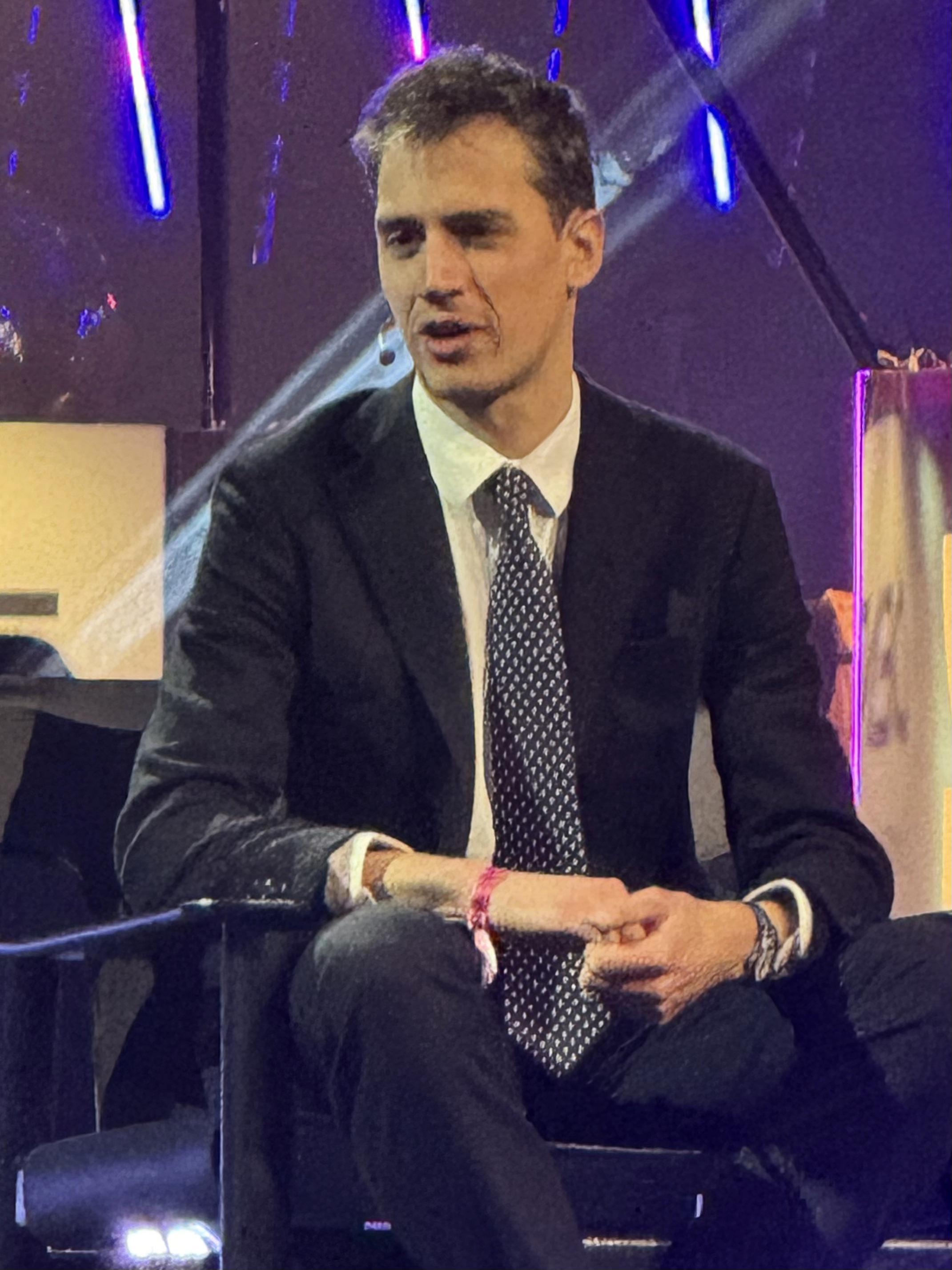
- Mensch in 2026
- Born: 17 July 1992 (age 34); Sèvres, France
- Education: École Polytechnique, Télécom Paris, Paris-Saclay University
- Occupations: Researcher, entrepreneur, ceo
- Known for: Co-founder & CEO of Mistral AI

Arthur Mensch (born 17 July 1992) is a French artificial intelligence researcher and entrepreneur, best known as the co-founder and CEO of the Paris-based AI company Mistral AI. He is one of the most prominent figures in Europe's AI ecosystem and is often cited in debates on AI policy, sovereign technology, and open models.

In 2025, Challenges ranked him among the 500 wealthiest French people. He was included in Time's 100 Most Influential People in AI in 2024, being featured in the list among innovators.

== Early life and education ==
Arthur Mensch was born on 17 July 1992 in Sèvres, and raised in Ville-d'Avray in the Hauts-de-Seine department near Paris. He is the son of a businessman father and a physics teacher mother. He studied at the École Polytechnique (2011) and Télécom Paris, then completed the Mathematics, Vision, Learning (MVA) master's program at the École normale supérieure Paris-Saclay. From 2015 to 2018, he was a PhD student at Inria / NeuroSpin (CEA, Saclay), supervised by Bertrand Thirion, Gaël Varoquaux and Julien Mairal, on predictive models and stochastic optimization for large-scale functional MRI analysis. From 2018 to 2020, he was a postdoctoral researcher at the ENS, working on optimal transport and stochastic optimization. He also spent several months at NYU's Courant Institute of Mathematical Sciences with Joan Bruna, focusing on multi-agent reinforcement learning.

== Early career at DeepMind ==
In late 2020, Mensch joined DeepMind Paris, where he worked for nearly three years on large language models (LLMs), multimodal systems, and retrieval-augmented architectures. He left in May 2023 to co-found Mistral AI.

== Founding of Mistral AI ==
In May 2023, Mensch co-founded Mistral AI with Guillaume Lample and Timothée Lacroix. The company name refers to the Mediterranean mistral wind, symbolizing speed and scale. Mistral's stated mission is to combine open science, efficiency, and enterprise utility, positioning itself as a European champion able to compete with U.S. tech giants.

== Public engagement and positions ==
Mensch frequently comments on:

- Regulation: should target applications, not base models.
- Deskilling risk: overreliance on AI may erode human expertise.
- Sovereignty: advocates European compute and sovereignty in AI.

Moreover, Mensch has testified before the French Senate and is a frequent conference speaker. In September 2023, he joined the generative AI expert committee established by Prime Minister Elisabeth Borne. In May 2024, he testified during a French Senate hearing, calling for increased public research funding, a more generous research tax credit (CIR), and greater labor law flexibility to support startups. He advocates for the transparency of open-source models, which he considers a guarantee of safety, and warns against the risk of "deskilling" (the loss of human skills) resulting from excessive dependence on AI. In May 2026, he testified before the French National Assembly's commission of inquiry on digital vulnerabilities, noting the potential impact of AI on unemployment rates. At a panel for business partners Nvidia's Jensen Huang interrupted Mensch several times for “not even speaking human,” presumably for speaking English with his French accent.

== Recognition ==
- Included as a Time 100 innovator in 2024.
- Appointed Knight of the National Order of Merit (15 May 2025).

== Personal life ==
Mensch keeps his private life largely confidential; some reports mention he became a father in 2024.
