= Mistral Vibe =

Generative AI chatbot by Mistral AI

- Other names: Le Chat
- Developer: Mistral AI
- Release: February 26, 2024; 2 years ago
- Operating system: Android, iOS, and web app
- Platform: Cloud computing platforms
- Type: Artificial intelligence; Virtual assistant; Chatbot
- Website: chat.mistral.ai

Mistral Vibe or Vibe (Le Chat until May 2026) is a chatbot that uses generative artificial intelligence developed in France by Mistral AI. Mistral Vibe is available in iOS and Android. Its services are operated on a freemium model.

== History ==
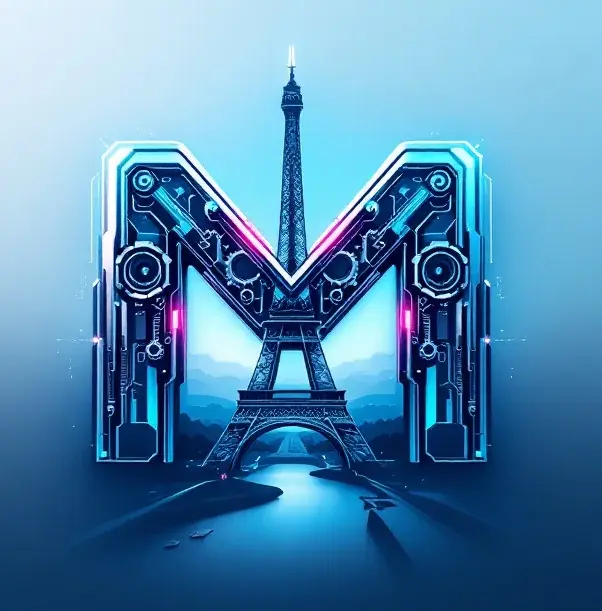
Example of an image generated with Vibe. The prompt is: Generate an image you feel represents yourself, Mistral AI.

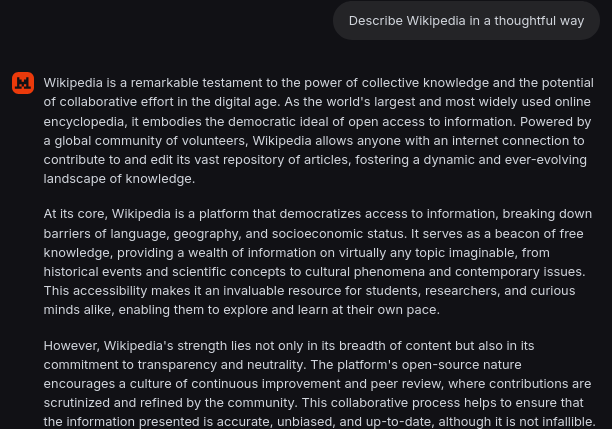
Screenshot of Vibe, Mistral AI chatbot, describing Wikipedia

In February 2024, Mistral AI released Le Chat.

In January 2025, Mistral AI made a content deal with Agence France-Presse (AFP) that lets Le Chat query AFP's entire archive dating back to 1983.

On 6 February 2025, a mobile app for Le Chat was released for iOS and Android, and a subscription tier, Pro, was introduced at a cost of $14.99 per month.

In July 2025, Mistral AI released Voxtral, an open-source language model that understands and generates audio. Mistral introduced a voice mode for chatting that uses Voxtral, and projects, which allows grouping chats and files.

In September 2025, Le Chat introduced the capability to remember previous conversations.

In May 2026, Mistral AI announced the rebrand from Le Chat to Mistral Vibe and new features were introduced at the same time.
