= Open WebUI =

Self-hosted user interface for artificial intelligence models

- Original author: Timothy J. Baek
- Developer: Open WebUI
- Release: 2023
- Stable release: 0.13.3 / 8 November 2026; 2 days ago
- Written in: Python, JavaScript, TypeScript
- Type: Large language model interface
- License: Open WebUI License
- Website: openwebui.com
- Repository: https://github.com/open-webui/open-webui

Open WebUI is a self-hosted graphical user interface for interacting with artificial intelligence models, particularly large language models. It can be used as a browser-based interface for locally hosted models through software such as Ollama and for remote models provided through OpenAI-compatible application programming interfaces (APIs).

When used with locally hosted models, Open WebUI can operate entirely offline, while remotely hosted models can be accessed over the Internet through third-party providers. It provides a ChatGPT-style interface while allowing users to select among different models and providers.

== History ==
Open WebUI was created by Timothy J. Baek in 2023 and was originally named Ollama WebUI. The project initially served as a web interface for Ollama before expanding to support additional model providers and APIs. It was renamed Open WebUI in February 2024 to reflect its broader scope.

== Features ==
Open WebUI provides a web-based chat interface that can connect to Ollama and services implementing an OpenAI-compatible API. Users can interact with multiple models from the same interface and deploy the software using methods including Docker, Kubernetes, or Python.

The software includes support for retrieval-augmented generation (RAG) using uploaded documents and knowledge bases. Other features include web search, image generation, voice interaction, model tools and external extensions.

Open WebUI can connect to external tools and services through mechanisms including OpenAPI servers and the Model Context Protocol (MCP). It also supports Python-based tools that execute within an Open WebUI installation.

Open WebUI is primarily used with locally hosted large language models, but it can also access models hosted by third-party providers through compatible APIs.

== Security ==
In 2025, a vulnerability in Open WebUI's Direct Connections feature, designated CVE-2025-64496, was disclosed. The vulnerability could allow malicious model servers to execute JavaScript in a user's browser and potentially lead to account takeover or remote code execution when combined with other functionality. It affected version 0.6.34 and earlier and was patched in version 0.6.35.

== See also ==
- List of AI-assisted software development tools
- Self-hosting (web services)
- Svelte
