= AirSim =

Robotics simulator

- Original author: Microsoft Research
- Developers: Microsoft and community
- Release: February 16, 2017; 9 years ago
- Stable release: 1.8.1 / July 17, 2022; 4 years ago
- Written in: C++
- Engine: Unreal Engine 4
- Operating system: Windows 10, macOS, Linux
- Type: Flight simulator
- License: MIT License
- Website: microsoft.github.io/AirSim
- Repository: github.com/microsoft/AirSim

AirSim (Aerial Informatics and Robotics Simulation) is an open-source, cross-platform simulator for drones, ground vehicles such as cars and various other objects, built on Epic Games’ proprietary Unreal Engine 4 as a platform for AI research. It is developed by Microsoft and can be used to experiment with deep learning, computer vision and reinforcement learning algorithms for autonomous vehicles. This allows testing of autonomous solutions without worrying about real-world damage.

AirSim provides some 12 kilometers of roads with 20 city blocks and APIs to retrieve data and control vehicles in a platform independent way. The APIs are accessible via a variety of programming languages, including C++, C#, Python and Java. AirSim supports hardware-in-the-loop with driving wheels and flight controllers such as PX4 for physically and visually realistic simulations. The platform also supports common robotic platforms, such as Robot Operating System (ROS). It is developed as an Unreal plug-in that can be dropped into any Unreal environment. An experimental release for a Unity plug-in is also available.

On December 15, 2023 Microsoft has shutdown the development of the project.

== See also ==
- Vehicle simulation game
- Microsoft Flight Simulator
