= Peltarion =

AI software company with offices in Stockholm and London

- Industry: Artificial intelligence
- Founded: 2004; 22 years ago
- Founders: Luka Crnkovic-Friis & Måns Erlandson
- Defunct: 30 September 2022
- Fate: Shut down and integrated to King
- Successor: King
- Headquarters: Stockholm, Sweden
- Products: Peltarion Platform, Peltarion Synapse
- Parent: King
- Website: peltarion.com

Peltarion is an AI software company with offices in Stockholm and London. In June 2022, the company was acquired by the video game developer King, which is owned by Activision Blizzard. On September 30, 2022, Peltarion was shut down as part of its integration into its new parent company. Both of the founders became Vice Presidents and Heads of AI/ML at King.

== History ==
Peltarion was founded in 2004 by Luka Crnkovic-Friis and Måns Erlandsson. The company was originally an AI consultancy that helped Tesla Inc., General Electric, and the U.S. space agency NASA use neural networks. Since 2016, the company has built an AI platform which has been used to help doctors to segment cancer tumors and farmers to optimize yields.

== Product ==
The Peltarion Platform is a cloud-based operational AI platform that allows users to build and deploy deep learning models.

The service offers an end-to-end platform that allows users do everything from pre-processing data to building models and producing them. All of this runs in the cloud and developers get access to a graphical user interface for building and testing their models.

== Philosophy ==
Peltarion has a strong philosophy behind the product and wants to advance humankind by bringing AI everywhere. Quote from chief executive Luka Crnkovic-Friis:

“AI-powered software shouldn’t be dominated by a few large technology companies. We strongly feel that the best way of making sure that the technology is used for good is to make sure that more people can use it.”

== See also ==
- Artificial intelligence
- Deep learning
- Artificial neural network
