= EDLUT =

Software for simulating neural networks

- Developer(s): University of Granada
- Type: Neural network
- License: GNU GPL 3
- Website: https://code.google.com/p/edlut/

EDLUT (Event-Driven LookUp Table) is a computer application for simulating networks of spiking neurons. It was developed in the University of Granada and source code was released under GNU GPL version 3.

EDLUT uses event-driven simulation scheme and lookup tables to efficiently simulate medium or large spiking neural networks. This allows this application to simulate detailed biological neuron models and to interface with experimental setups (such as a robotic arm) in real time.
