= Mistral AI =

French artificial intelligence company

Mistral AI SAS
- Logo since 2025
- Type: Private
- Industry: Artificial intelligence
- Founded: 28 April 2023; 3 years ago
- Founders: Arthur Mensch; Guillaume Lample; Timothée Lacroix
- Headquarters: Paris, France
- Key people: Arthur Mensch (CEO); Guillaume Lample (Chief Scientist); Timothée Lacroix (CTO)
- Products: Mistral Large 4; Mistral Large 3; Mistral Medium 3.5; Mistral Small 4; Ministral 3 (14/8/3B); Codestral-2508; Mistral OCR 3; Magistral 1.2; Devstral 2; Voxtral
- Number of employees: 1,000+ (2026)
- Website: mistral.ai

Mistral AI SAS (French: [mistʁal]) is a French artificial intelligence (AI) company headquartered in Paris. Founded in 2023, it develops large language models (LLMs).

As of November 2026, its largest public model is Mistral Large 4, released on October 29th 2026, a mixture of experts model with 1 trillion parameters, of which 52 billion are active. In February 2024, Mistral released Le Chat, its chatbot, which was rebranded Mistral Vibe in 2026.

Mistral is a primary beneficiary of a push by the European Union and its member governments towards digital sovereignty in response to the AI boom and AI arms race between the US and China. In September 2025, ASML, Europe's largest tech company by market capitalization and supplier of the semiconductor industry, invested €1.3 billion in Mistral, corresponding to an 11% shareholding.

== Namesake ==
The company is named after the mistral, a powerful and cold northwesterly wind that blows in southern France.

== History ==
Mistral AI was established in April 2023 by three French AI researchers—Arthur Mensch, Guillaume Lample and Timothée Lacroix. Mensch, an expert in advanced AI systems, is a former employee of Google DeepMind; Lample and Lacroix, meanwhile, are large-scale AI models specialists who had worked for Meta Platforms. The trio originally met during their studies at École polytechnique.

In February 2026, Mistral acquired Koyeb, a Paris-based AI startup.

On 19 May 2026, Mistral AI announced its acquisition of the Austrian company Emmi AI, which develops artificial intelligence simulation models for industrial engineering.

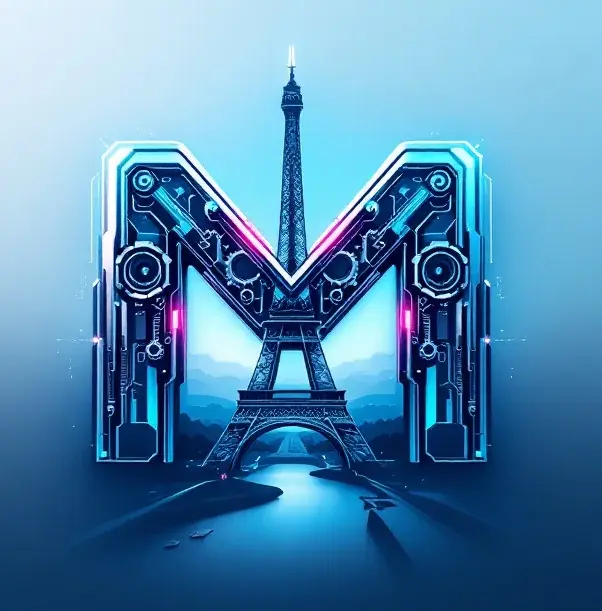
Example of an image generated with Le Chat. The prompt is: Generate an image you feel represents yourself, Mistral AI.

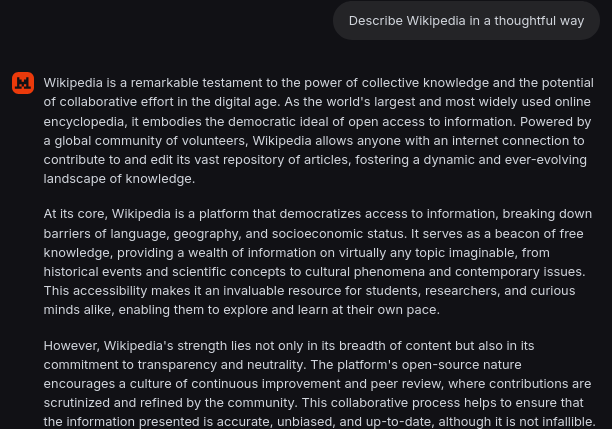
Screenshot of Le Chat, Mistral AI chatbot, describing Wikipedia

== Company operation ==
=== Funding ===
In June 2023, the start-up carried out a first fundraising of €105 million ($117 million) with investors including the American fund Lightspeed Venture Partners, Eric Schmidt, Xavier Niel and JCDecaux. The valuation was then estimated by the Financial Times at €240 million ($267 million).

On 10 December 2023, Mistral AI announced that it had raised €385 million ($428 million) as part of its second fundraising. This round of financing involves the Californian fund Andreessen Horowitz, BNP Paribas and the software publisher Salesforce. It was valued at over €2 billion.

On 26 February 2024, Microsoft announced an investment of $16 million in Mistral AI.

On 16 April 2024, reporting revealed that Mistral was in talks to raise €500 million, a deal that would more than double its current valuation to at least €5 billion.

In June 2024, Mistral AI secured a €600 million ($645 million) funding round, increasing its valuation to €5.8 billion ($6.2 billion). Based on valuation, as of June 2024, the company was ranked fourth globally in the AI industry, and first outside the San Francisco Bay Area.

In April 2025, Mistral AI announced a €100 million partnership with the shipping company CMA CGM.

In August 2025, the Financial Times reported that Mistral was in talks to raise $1 billion at a $10 billion valuation. In September 2025, Bloomberg announced that Mistral AI has secured a €2 billion investment valuing it at €12 billion ($14 billion). This comes after $1.5 billion investment from Dutch company ASML, which owns 11% of Mistral.

In February 2026, Mistral AI announced a strategic partnership with Accenture to deploy enterprise AI at scale. Financial terms were not disclosed.

In March 2026, Mistral raised $830 million in order to build new datacenters near Paris and in Sweden.

In March 2026, Mistral announced a partnership with NVIDIA aimed at accelerating the development and deployment of open frontier AI models.

In July 2026, Mistral expanded its partnership with Microsoft through a multibillion-dollar agreement supporting the development of AI infrastructure in Europe. Microsoft agreed to use part of Mistral's expanded European computing capacity, while the companies added the Mistral Medium 3.5 and OCR 4 models to Microsoft Foundry and Medium 3.5 to Copilot Studio.

In September 2026, Samsung Electronics acquired a stake in Mistral (a €3 billion transaction). Mistral's valuation subsequently reached €21 billion.

== Services ==
On 19 November 2024, the company announced updates for Le Chat (French pronunciation: [lə ʃa]; lit. 'the cat'). It added the ability to create images, using Black Forest Labs' Flux Pro model.

On 6 February 2025, Mistral AI released Le Chat on iOS and Android mobile devices.

Mistral AI also introduced a Pro subscription tier, priced at $14.99 per month, which provides access to more advanced models, unlimited messaging, and web browsing.

At the end of May 2026, Le Chat was renamed Vibe, and new features were introduced at the same time.

== Political significance ==
As the largest and highest-valuation European artificial intelligence company, Mistral is a primary beneficiary of the push by the European Union and its member governments towards digital sovereignty in response to the AI boom and AI arms race between the US and China. In May 2026, CEO Arthur Mensch gave a speech to France's National Assembly arguing against France becoming a US "vassal state" including via the use of foreign AI in the French Armed Forces.

== Models ==
The following table lists the main model versions of Mistral, describing the significant changes included with each version:

Name	Release date	Status	Number of parameters (billion)	License	Notes
Large 4	October 2026	Active	1000 (52 active)	Mistral Ecosystem Open-Weight License	Flagship model, MoE.
Medium 3.5	April 2026	Active	128	Modified MIT license	First flagship merged model.
Voxtral TTS	March 2026	Active	4	CC BY-NC 4.0	First text-to-speech model.
Mistral Small 4	March 2026	Active	119	Apache-2.0	Combines 128 experts, with 4 active per token. Accepts both text and images as inputs.
Voxtral Realtime	February 2026	Active	4	Apache-2.0	Realtime speech transcription.
Voxtral Mini Transcribe V2	February 2026	Active	?	Proprietary	Speech understanding model.
Devstral Small 2	December 2025	Active	24	Apache-2.0	Compact, locally deployable coding model.
Devstral 2	December 2025	Active	123	Modified MIT license	Dense model.
Mistral Large 3	December 2025	Active	675 (41 active)	Apache-2.0	A sparse mixture-of-experts models.
Ministral 3	December 2025	Active	3, 8 and 14	Apache-2.0	Three small, dense models with image understanding.
Magistral Medium 1.2 25.09	September 2025	Active	?	Proprietary	A refresh of Magistral Medium.
Magistral Small 1.2 25.09	September 2025	Active	24	Apache-2.0	A refresh of Magistral Small.
Mistral Medium 3.1 25.08	August 2025	Active	?	Proprietary	A refresh of Mistral Medium 3, with improved tone and performance.
Codestral 25.08	August 2025	Active	?	Proprietary	Code generation model.
Voxtral Small	July 2025	Active	24	Apache-2.0	Speech understanding model.
Voxtral Mini	July 2025	Active	3	Apache-2.0	Speech understanding model.
Devstral Medium 1.0	July 2025	Active	?	Proprietary	Agentic coding model.
Devstral Small 1.1 25.07	July 2025	Active	24	Apache-2.0	Agentic coding model.
Mistral Small 3.2 25.06	June 2025	Active	24	Proprietary	A refresh of Mistral Small 3.1.
Magistral Medium	June 2025	?	?	Proprietary	Enterprise reasoning model.
Magistral Small	June 2025	?	24	Apache-2.0	Open-weight reasoning model.
Devstral Small 25.05	May 2025	Active	24	Apache-2.0	Agentic model for software engineering tasks.
Mistral Medium 3 25.05	May 2025	?	?	Proprietary	Enterprise model available for on-premise deployment.
Mistral Small 3.1 25.03	March 2025	?	24	Apache-2.0	Version v3.1 was released March 2025.
Mistral Small 3 25.01	January 2025	?	24	Apache-2.0	Release in January 2025, Mistral Small 3 features 24B parameters.
Codestral 25.01	January 2025	?	?	Proprietary	Code generation model
Mistral Large 2 24.11	November 2024	?	123	Mistral Research License	
Pixtral Large 24.11	November 2024	?	124	Mistral Research License	On November 19, 2024, the company introduced Pixtral Large, which integrates a 1-billion-parameter visual encoder coupled with Mistral Large 2.
Ministral 8B 24.10	October 2024	?	8	Mistral Research License	
Ministral 3B 24.10	October 2024	?	3	Proprietary	
Pixtral 24.09	September 2024	?	12	Apache-2.0	
Mistral Large 2 24.07	July 2024	?	123	Mistral Research License	Mistral Large 2 was announced on July 24, 2024, and released on Hugging Face. It is available for free with a Mistral Research Licence, and with a commercial licence for commercial purposes. Mistral AI claims that it is fluent in dozens of languages, including many programming languages. Unlike the previous Mistral Large, this version was released with open weights. The model has 123 billion parameters and a context length of 128,000 tokens.
Codestral Mamba 7B	July 2024	?	7	Apache-2.0	Codestral Mamba was released under the Apache 2.0 license. While previous releases often included both the base model and the instruct version, only the instruct version of Codestral Mamba was released.
Mathstral 7B	July 2024	?	7	Apache-2.0	Mathstral 7B is a model with 7 billion parameters released by Mistral AI on July 16, 2024, focusing on STEM subjects. The model was produced in collaboration with Project Numina, and was released under the Apache 2.0 License with a context length of 32k tokens.
Codestral 22B	May 2024	?	22	Mistral Non-Production License	Codestral is Mistral's first code-focused open weight model which was launched on May 29, 2024. Mistral claims Codestral is fluent in more than 80 programming languages Codestral has its own license which forbids the usage of Codestral for commercial purposes.
Mixtral 8x22B	April 2024	?	141	Apache-2.0	Similar to Mistral's previous open models, Mixtral 8x22B was released via a BitTorrent link on Twitter on April 10, 2024, with a release on Hugging Face soon after. The model uses an architecture similar to that of Mistral 8x7B, but with each expert having 22 billion parameters instead of 7. In total, the model contains 141 billion parameters, as some parameters are shared among the experts, but offering higher performance.
Mistral Small	February 2024	?	?	Proprietary	Like the Large model, Mistral Small was launched on February 26, 2024.
Mistral Large 24.02	February 2024	?	?	Proprietary	Mistral Large was launched on February 26, 2024. It outputs in English, French, Spanish, German, and Italian, and provides coding capabilities.
Mistral Medium	December 2023	?	?	Proprietary	Mistral Medium is trained in various languages including English, French, Italian, German, Spanish.
Mixtral 8x7B	December 2023	?	46.7	Apache-2.0	Much like Mistral's first model, Mixtral 8x7B was released via a BitTorrent link posted on Twitter on December 9, 2023, and later Hugging Face and a blog post were released two days later.
Mistral 7B	September 2023	?	7.3	Apache-2.0	Mistral 7B is a 7.3B parameter language model using the transformers architecture. It was officially released on September 27, 2023, via a BitTorrent magnet link, and Hugging Face under the Apache 2.0 license. Both a base model and "instruct" model were released with the latter receiving additional tuning to follow chat-style prompts. The fine-tuned model is only intended for demonstration purposes, and does not have guardrails or moderation built-in.

=== Mistral 7B ===
Mistral AI claimed in the Mistral 7B release blog post that the model outperforms LLaMA 2 13B on all benchmarks tested, and is on par with LLaMA 34B on many benchmarks tested, despite having only 7 billion parameters, a small size compared to its competitors.

=== Mixtral 8x7B ===
Mistral AI claimed in 2023 that its model beat both LLaMA 70B, and GPT-3.5 in most benchmarks.

In March 2024, research conducted by Patronus AI comparing performance of LLMs on a 100-question test with prompts to generate text from books protected under U.S. copyright law found that OpenAI's GPT-4, Mixtral, Meta AI's LLaMA-2, and Anthropic's Claude 2 generated copyrighted text verbatim in 44%, 22%, 10%, and 8% of responses respectively.

=== Mistral Small 3.1 ===
On 17 March 2025, Mistral released Mistral Small 3.1 as a smaller, more efficient model.

=== Mistral Medium 3 ===
On 7 May 2025, Mistral AI released Mistral Medium 3.

=== Magistral Small and Magistral Medium ===
On 10 June 2025, Mistral AI released their first AI reasoning models: Magistral Small (open-source), and Magistral Medium, models which are purported to have chain-of-thought capabilities.

=== Mistral Large 3 and Ministral 3 ===
On 2 December 2025, Mistral AI released Mistral Large 3, a sparse, mixture-of-experts model with 41 billion active parameters and 675 billion total parameters, and Ministral 3, three small, dense models with 3 billion, 7 billion and 14 billion parameters.

=== Devstral 2 and Devstral Small 2 ===
On 10 December 2025, Mistral AI released Devstral 2 and Devstral Small 2. Devstral Small 2, a 24B parameter model is claimed to achieve better performance at coding than Qwen 3 Coder Flash model which is a 30B parameter model.

=== Mistral Small 4 ===
in March 2026, Mistral AI released Mistral Small 4, a hybrid multimodal model that combines instruction following, reasoning and coding capabilities. The model supports text and image unputs, has 256,000-token context window, and was released under the Apache 2.0 license.

=== Voxtral TTS ===
In March 2026, Mistral AI released Voxtral TTS, an open-weights text-to-speech model designed for multilingual speech generation and voice-agent applications. The model supports zero-shot voice cloning and real-time streaming.

=== OCR 4 ===
In June 2026, Mistral AI released Mistral OCR 4, an optical character recognition and document-understanding model.

=== Robostral Navigate ===
In July 2026, Mistral AI introduced Robostral Navigate, its first model designed for embodied navigation. The model was developed for applications involving navigation and interaction with physical environments.

=== Shieldstral ===
In August 2026, Mistral AI introduced Shieldstral, a model focused on AI safety and security applications.

=== Mistral Large 4 ===
On October 6th, 2026, Mistral announced preview access to Mistral Large 4, a 1 trillion parameters MoE model. Open weights were released on October 29th.

== See also ==
- Reasoning model
- List of large language models
- Lists of open-source artificial intelligence software
