= List of Swift software and tools =

Swift software and development tools

This is a list of software and programming tools for the Swift programming language, which includes frameworks, libraries, IDEs, build tools, and related projects.

== Frameworks, libraries, and APIs ==
- Alamofire — HTTP networking library
- Cocoa — Apple’s native API for macOS
- Cocoa Touch — variant of Cocoa for iOS, iPadOS, watchOS, and tvOS.
- Kitura — web framework from IBM (now community maintained)
- Metal (API) – low-overhead hardware-accelerated 3D graphic and compute shader API
- Perfect — server-side Swift web framework
- RxSwift — reactive programming library for Swift
- SceneKit — A 3D graphics framework often used with Swift and SwiftUI for rendering scenes and animations
- SnapKit — Auto Layout DSL for iOS/macOS
- SwiftNIO — event-driven networking framework
- SwiftGraph — a graph data structure and algorithms library
- SwiftProtobuf — Protocol Buffers implementation for Swift
- SwiftUI – declarative framework for building user interfaces and Swift Charts for Apple operating systems
- SwiftyJSON — easier JSON handling in Swift
- Vapor — web application framework for Swift

== Machine learning and AI ==
- Swift for TensorFlow — experimental deep learning framework from Google (discontinued, but open source)
- Core ML — Apple’s machine learning framework for on-device inference
- Create ML — Apple’s macOS app and framework for training ML models

== Math and scientific computing ==
- Surge — Swift framework for linear algebra, DSP, and math functions
- Accelerate framework — Apple’s high-performance math and DSP library for Swift and Objective-C

== Integrated development environments ==
- Xcode — Apple’s official IDE for Swift and Objective-C
- AppCode — IDE for Swift from JetBrains
- Swift Playgrounds — educational environment for iPad and macOS
- Visual Studio Code — with Swift extensions via SourceKit-LSP

== Text editors with Swift support ==
- GNU Emacs — Swift mode and LSP support
- Sublime Text — Swift syntax and build system plugins
- TextMate – via official Swift bundle providing syntax highlighting and snippets
- Vim — via Swift Vim plugins and Neovim
- Visual Studio Code — Swift LSP support through SourceKit-LSP
- Zed — fork of Atom with support for Swift

== Build tools and package managers ==
- Swift Package Manager (SwiftPM) — official dependency manager for Swift
- CocoaPods — dependency manager for Swift and Objective-C projects
- Carthage — decentralized dependency manager
- Bazel — build system with Swift rules support

== Compilers and runtimes ==
- LLVM
- Swift for Windows — community distribution of Swift on Windows
- Swift WASM — Swift toolchain for WebAssembly

== Debugging and profiling tools ==
- Instruments — performance analysis and profiling tool bundled with Xcode
- LLDB — debugger used by Swift (via LLVM project)
- Xcode memory graph debugger

== Testing and quality assurance ==
- XCTest — official unit testing framework bundled with Swift
- Quick — behavior-driven development (BDD) framework
- Nimble — matcher framework often used with Quick

== See also ==
- Apple Developer Tools
- Chris Lattner – original developer of Swift
- Lists of programming software development tools by language
- MoltenVK – software library which allows Vulkan applications to run on top of Metal
