= XLA =

XLA may refer to:

- XLA (singer) (born 1981), Canadian indie singer
- XLA (Accelerated Linear Algebra), a domain-specific compiler for linear algebra that can accelerate TensorFlow models
- .xla, a file format for Microsoft Excel add-ins
- X-linked agammaglobulinemia, an immune deficiency
- Xbox Live Avatar, a character representing a user of the Xbox video game consoles
- Xin Los Angeles, a 2006 container ship registered in Hong Kong
- Dow XLA elastic fiber, a marketing name for Lastol
- X-stem Logic Alphabet
- XLA, the ICAO three letter callsign of former airline XL Airways UK
