= Jussara (disambiguation) =

Jussara is a municipality in Goiás, Brazil.

Jussara may also refer to:

== People ==
- Jussara M. Almeida (born 1973), Brazilian computer scientist
- Jussara Castro (born 1982), handball player from Uruguay
- Jussara Chaves (born 1959), Brazilian chess player
- Jussara Freire (born 1951), Brazilian actress
- Jussara Lima (born 1960), Brazilian sociologist and politician

== Places ==
- Jussara, Bahia, a municipality in Brazil
- Jussara, Paraná, a municipality in Brazil

== Other uses ==
- Jussara (harvestman), a genus of arachnids
