= List of programming languages for artificial intelligence =

Historically, some programming languages have been specifically designed for artificial intelligence (AI) applications. Nowadays, many general-purpose programming languages also have libraries that can be used to develop AI applications.

== General-purpose languages ==
- Python is a high-level, general-purpose programming language that is popular in artificial intelligence. It has a simple, flexible and easily readable syntax. Its popularity results in a vast ecosystem of libraries, including for deep learning, such as PyTorch, TensorFlow, Keras, Google JAX. The library NumPy can be used for manipulating arrays, SciPy for scientific and mathematical analysis, Pandas for analyzing table data, Scikit-learn for various machine learning tasks, NLTK and spaCy for natural language processing, OpenCV for computer vision, and Matplotlib for data visualization. Hugging Face's transformers library can manipulate large language models. Jupyter Notebooks can execute cells of Python code, retaining the context between the execution of cells, which usually facilitates interactive data exploration.
- Elixir is a high-level functional programming language based on the Erlang VM. Its machine-learning ecosystem includes Nx for computing on CPUs and GPUs, Bumblebee and Axon for serving and training models, Broadway for distributed processing pipelines, Membrane for image and video processing, Livebook for prototyping and publishing notebooks, and Nerves for embedding on devices.
- R is widely used in new-style artificial intelligence, involving statistical computations, numerical analysis, the use of Bayesian inference, neural networks and in general machine learning. In domains like finance, biology, sociology or medicine it is considered one of the main standard languages. It offers several paradigms of programming like vectorial computation, functional programming and object-oriented programming.
- Lisp was the first language developed for artificial intelligence. It includes features intended to support programs that could perform general problem solving, such as lists, associations, schemas (frames), dynamic memory allocation, data types, recursion, associative retrieval, functions as arguments, generators (streams), and cooperative multitasking.
- MATLAB is a proprietary numerical computing language developed by MathWorks. MATLAB has many toolboxes specifically for the development of AI including the Statistics and Machine Learning Toolbox and Deep Learning Toolbox. These toolboxes provide APIs for the high-level and low-level implementation and use of many types of machine learning models that can integrate with the rest of the MATLAB ecosystem. These libraries also have support for code generation for embedded hardware.
- C++ is a compiled language that can interact with low-level hardware. In the context of AI, it is particularly used for embedded systems and robotics. Libraries such as TensorFlow C++, Caffe or Shogun can be used.
- JavaScript is widely used for web applications and can notably be executed with web browsers. Libraries for AI include TensorFlow.js, Synaptic and Brain.js.
- Julia is a language launched in 2012, which intends to combine ease of use and performance. It is mostly used for numerical analysis, computational science, and machine learning.
- C# can be used to develop high level machine learning models using Microsoft’s .NET suite. ML.NET was developed to aid integration with existing .NET projects, simplifying the process for existing software using the .NET platform.
- Smalltalk has been used extensively for simulations, neural networks, machine learning, and genetic algorithms. It implements a pure and elegant form of object-oriented programming using message passing.
- Haskell is a purely functional programming language. Lazy evaluation and the list and LogicT monads make it easy to express non-deterministic algorithms, which is often the case. Infinite data structures are useful for search trees. The language's features enable a compositional way to express algorithms. Working with graphs is however a bit harder at first because of functional purity.
- Wolfram Language includes a wide range of integrated machine learning abilities, from highly automated functions like Predict and Classify to functions based on specific methods and diagnostics. The functions work on many types of data, including numerical, categorical, time series, textual, and image.
- Mojo can run some Python programs, and supports programmability of AI hardware. It aims to combine the usability of Python with the performance of low-level programming languages like C++ or Rust.

== Specialized languages ==
- Prolog is a declarative language where programs are expressed in terms of relations, and execution occurs by running queries over these relations. Prolog is particularly useful for symbolic reasoning, database and language parsing applications.
- Artificial Intelligence Markup Language (AIML) is an XML dialect for use with Artificial Linguistic Internet Computer Entity (A.L.I.C.E.)-type chatterbots.
- Planner is a hybrid between procedural and logical languages. It gives a procedural interpretation to logical sentences where implications are interpreted with pattern-directed inference.
- Stanford Research Institute Problem Solver (STRIPS) is a language to express automated planning problem instances. It expresses an initial state, the goal states, and a set of actions. For each action preconditions (what must be established before the action is performed) and postconditions (what is established after the action is performed) are specified.
- POP-11 is a reflective, incrementally compiled programming language with many of the features of an interpreted language. It is the core language of the Poplog programming environment developed originally by the University of Sussex, and recently in the School of Computer Science at the University of Birmingham which hosts the Poplog website, It is often used to introduce symbolic programming techniques to programmers of more conventional languages like Pascal, who find POP syntax more familiar than that of Lisp. One of POP-11's features is that it supports first-class functions.
- CycL is a special-purpose language for Cyc.

== See also ==
- Glossary of artificial intelligence
- List of constraint programming languages
- List of computer algebra systems
- List of logic programming languages
- List of constructed languages
- Fifth-generation programming language
