= Mlir =

Mlir or MLIR may refer to:

- MLIR (software), framework for compiler development
- Multilingual information retrieval, a field of information retrieval
- Modern Life Is Rubbish, studio album by Blur
