= Lattner =

Lattner is a surname. Notable people with the surname include:

- Chris Lattner (born 1978), American software developer
- Johnny Lattner (1932–2016), American football player
