= Mary Vernon =

Mary Vernon may refer to

- Mary Vernon, stillborn child of fictional character Jenny Wolek on the One Life to Live soap opera
- 'Mary Vernon', a cultivar of Iris variegata
- Mary Vernon, a painter of flowers, fruits, and still lifes, listed in English Female Artists (1876)
- Mary K. Vernon, American computer scientist
- The Honourable Mary Venables-Vernon, daughter of the 1st Lord Vernon and wife of George Anson (1731–1789)
