= Perfect (server framework) =

- Developer: PerfectlySoft Inc.
- Initial release: 23 November 2015; 10 years ago
- Stable release: 4.0.1 / 8 February 2021; 4 years ago
- Repository: github.com/PerfectlySoft/Perfect
- Written in: Swift
- Operating system: OS X, Linux
- Platform: x86
- Available in: English
- Type: Web framework, application server
- License: Apache
- Website: perfect.org

Perfect is an application server, web and server framework written in the programming language Swift. It provides tools for developing web and other representational state transfer (REST) services in Swift, and web server and datasource connectors, providing default structures for developers working with databases, web services, and web pages. Its main focus is to make mobile development easier by using the Swift language on both sides of the client–server model, the client mobile device, and the server, where it competes with other server-side development tools such as Node.js and Python. It is open-source software, released under an Apache License.

== History ==
Perfect 1.0 was released on November 23, 2015, just before the Swift language became open-source, and draws much of its history from a programming language named Lasso, formerly part of Apple's product line.

Version 2.0 was rolled out September 6, 2016 and brought Swift 3 compatibility and a more modular approach to the framework. The revised approach enabled developers to choose the specific features to include in Perfect-oriented projects rather than having all features bundled in by default.

== See also ==
- Vapor
