= Swift Playground =

Development environment for Swift

- Other names: Swift Playgrounds
- Developers: Developer Tools Department; Apple Inc
- Release: iPad; September 13, 2016; 10 years ago macOS; February 11, 2020; 6 years ago
- Platform: iPadOS, macOS
- Available in: Dutch, English, French, German, Italian, Japanese, Korean, Portuguese, Simplified Chinese, Spanish, Swedish, Thai, Traditional Chinese, Turkish
- Type: Education App

Swift Playground (formerly Swift Playgrounds) is an educational tool and development environment for the Swift programming language developed by Apple Inc., initially announced at the WWDC 2016 conference. It was introduced as an iPad application alongside iOS 10, with a macOS version introduced in February 2020. It is available for free via Apple's App Store for iPadOS and Mac App Store for macOS.

In addition to publishing the Swift Playground application itself, Apple also produces a series of educational lessons teaching programming and debugging skills. The application can also subscribe to lessons and other content published by third parties, including lessons allowing users to control educational toys such as Lego Mindstorms EV3 and Sphero robots. Apple publishes a curriculum guide for educators wishing to incorporate Swift Playground into their teaching.

== Features ==
Screenshot of Swift Playgrounds. The goal of this exercise is to help Byte collect a gem using a combination of simple commands.

Swift Playground was designed to be a development environment and an education tool simultaneously. The app allows users to download lessons and challenges. Once stored on the iPad, these can be copied and modified without the need of an active internet connection.

Apple's initial lessons, available for all Swift Playground users to download, introduce three characters: Byte, Blu, and Hopper. In each challenge, young coders are asked to assist these characters achieving simple goals by coding simple instructions. As challenges become more difficult, more complex algorithms are required to solve them and new concepts are introduced. Advanced lessons in Playgrounds introduce users to more complex features such as Apple's Bluetooth and Augmented Reality development platform (ARKit) APIs.

In addition to Apple's own educational content, Swift Playground can download third-party lessons through its subscriptions feature. Some third-party lessons allow the app to control robots (such as Lego Mindstorms EV3 and Sphero educational toys) and drones (such as the Parrot). Apple also offers coding classes using Swift Playground at Apple Stores.

Swift Playground was designed to be fully accessible to users with disabilities. It supports Apple's VoiceOver screen reader technology, and at WWDC 2020 Apple introduced a series of lessons called "Swan's Quest" which use accessibility features to help students solve puzzles.

== History ==
The Swift Playgrounds application was announced on June 13, 2016 at WWDC 2016 as an iPad exclusive app to help people learning to code with Apple's Swift programming language. A beta version for Apple developers was released on the same date, followed by a public beta version in the following month. The app was presented as a teaching tool for students, introducing the core concepts of coding using an interactive environment designed for touch. The application's name is an apparent reference to Xcode's earlier Playgrounds feature, introduced in 2014.

Along with iOS 10, the app was officially released on September 13, 2016. Apple also published a curriculum guide, recommending the iPad app for middle school students and up. In January 2018, Apple introduced subscriptions to the iPad application, allowing users to subscribe to playgrounds developed by third parties.

On February 11, 2020, Apple released a macOS version of Swift Playgrounds on the Mac App Store, built using Apple's Catalyst technology. Subsequent versions of the application have supported both iPadOS and macOS, with most of Apple's curriculum available on both platforms. For WWDC 2020, Apple published a session instructing third-party developers on how to support both platforms in their subscriptions.

On January 31, 2025, the application was renamed from Swift Playgrounds to Swift Playground with the release of version 4.6.

=== Development ===
The iPad version of the Swift Playgrounds (1.0) was released on September 13, 2016. Chris Lattner was also one of the few core people who drove Swift Playgrounds for iPad, including conception, design, implementation, and iteration. Simultaneously with its release, Apple published guides on the iBookStore to teach users how to navigate and use the application. The launch coincided with a large Silicon Valley campaign to press public schools to teach coding and was followed by Apple's announcement of the "Everyone Can Code" initiative, a program that provides computer science curriculum to help kids learn how to code. Swift Playgrounds is included in this program as free coding curriculum and Apple provides detailed guides to walk teachers through teaching Swift. Apple also released "App Development with Swift", a year-long curriculum for teaching Swift software development and later introduced a Swift certification program to validate coding skills for students.

In May 2018, Apple announced the extension of "Everyone Can Code" initiative to US schools serving blind and deaf students. In January 2017, Apple partnered with RNIB (Royal National Institute of Blind People) to provide braille versions of the Swift Playgrounds graphics used in its coding course.

In 2020, Apple launches the Swift Student Challenge, a competition in which students can submit code written in Swift through Swift Playgrounds.

In February 2020, Apple launches Swift Playgrounds 3.2 for Mac as a dedicated app on the AppStore, keeping the same focus of helping kids to learn to code with Apple's Swift programming language.

=== Version history ===
Date	Version	Description
June 2016		Apple announces Swift Playgrounds for iPad - version for Apple Developers is released
July 2016		Public beta version released
September 2016	1.0	First version is released
March 2017	1.2	Language support for Simplified Chinese, Japanese, French, German and Latin American Spanish; Support for MapKit framework
June 2017	1.5	Possibility to write code to control robots and drones (Lego Mindstorms EV3, Parrot, Sphero...)
September 2017	1.6	Support for ARKit (Augmented Reality) Support for Swift 4 Access to camera
January 2018	2.0	Subscriptions for third-party playgrounds made available.
April 2018	2.1	Support for Swift 4.1
November 2018	2.2	Support for Swift 4.2
May 2019	3.0	Support for Swift 5 Shared Swift files
October 2019	3.1	Support for Swift 5.1 SwiftUI framework included
February 2020	3.2 (macOS-only)	Support for macOS
April 2020	3.3	Support for iPadOS cursor
November 2020	3.4	Console area shows the output of print() statements Export as new playground feature
December 2021	4.0	Apps can be built with SwiftUI
May 2022	4.1	Guided walkthroughs teach SwiftUI app building basics Build and run apps on macOS 12.4
October 2022	4.2	Customizable toolbar to have favorite items App Preview tabs for multiple previews
April 2023	4.3	Support for Swift 5.8
September 2023	4.4	Support for Swift 5.9
April 2024	4.5	In-app navigation tools includes Open Quickly, Quick Actions, and Jump to Line Support for Swift 5.10
May 2024	4.5.1	Support for iOS 17.5 SDK and macOS 14.5 SDK
January 2025	4.6	Renamed from Swift Playgrounds to Swift Playground Includes a new document browser to easily create a new playground or find a recent one
March 2026	4.7	Support for Swift 6, iOS 26 SDK and macOS 26 SDK

== Reception ==
Upon release, Swift Playgrounds reached the first place in the top free iPad education apps in nearly 100 countries. The app received generally positive reviews from users (4/5 rating score on the App Store) and from the press. The app's ability to make serious coding accessible to young students was praised, as well as the fact that it was not excessively focused on Swift but rather in teaching good coding practices. Common Sense Media rates Swift Playgrounds with a 5/5 ranking score.
