= Xin Los Angeles =

Container ship built in 2006

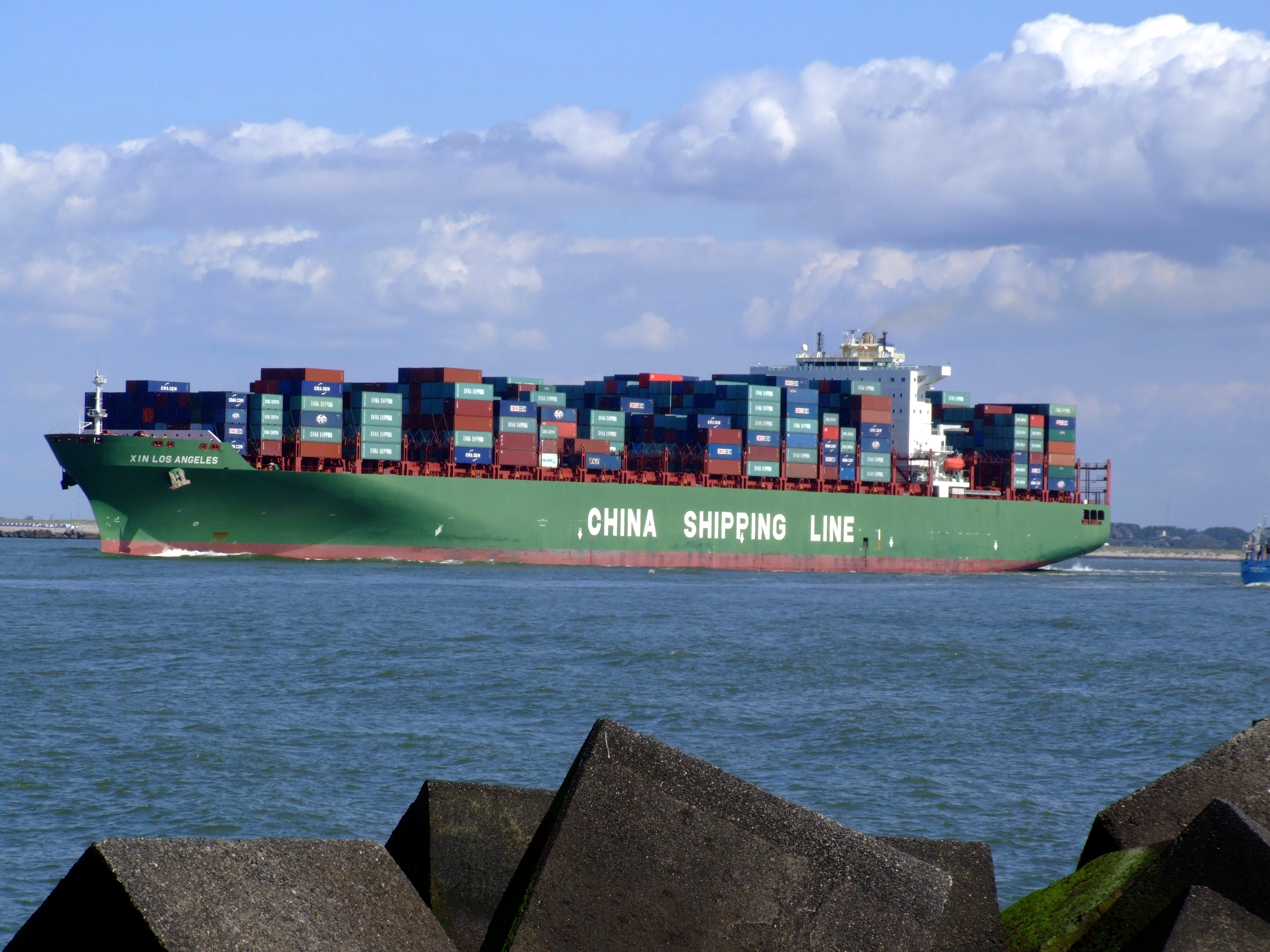
- Xin Los Angeles, leaving Port of Rotterdam

History
- Name: Xin Los Angeles
- Operator: China Shipping Container Lines
- Port of registry: Hong Kong
- Builder: Samsung Heavy Industries
- Launched: 12 April 2006
- Identification: Call sign: VRBX6; IMO number: 9307217; MMSI number: 477158700
- Status: In service

General characteristics
- Tonnage: 107,200 DWT
- Length: 336.7 m (1,105 ft)
- Beam: 45.6 m (150 ft)
- Draught: 14.3 m (47 ft)
- Installed power: MAN B&W 12K98MC-C (68,520 kW)
- Speed: 25.4 knots (47.0 km/h; 29.2 mph) (maximum); 24.7 knots (45.7 km/h; 28.4 mph) (cruising)
- Capacity: 9,600 TEU

Xin Los Angeles (also known as XLA) is a container ship owned and operated by China Shipping Container Lines. She was the largest in the world at the time of her completion in 2006, but since been overtaken in size by several vessels, some with more than double her capacity. Xin Los Angeles has a capacity of 9,600 TEU and is one of a class of six. She is registered in Hong Kong.

== Design ==
Xin Los Angeles was launched in 2004 in the ship-yard of Samsung Heavy Industries and was completed in 2006. She has a deadweight tonnage of 107,200 metric tons, is 336.7 meters long and has a beam of 45.6 meters and a draft of 14.3 meters, when fully loaded. The design of the hull allows for decreased water resistance and the hull paint prevents the growth of duckweed and molluscs.

== Engine ==
Xin Los Angeles main engines are MAN B&W 12K98MC-C Mk6. During sea trials the ship achieved a ballast service speed of 25.4 knots. At full power the engines provide 68,520 kW and a cruising speed when fully loaded of 23.4 knots.
