= Kitura =

- Developers: IBM and others
- Release: 9 February 2016; 10 years ago
- Final release: 3.0.0 / September 18, 2022; 4 years ago
- Written in: Swift
- Operating system: OS X, iOS, Linux
- Platform: x86, IBM Z
- Type: Web framework
- License: Apache License 2.0
- Website: www.kitura.dev
- Repository: github.com/Kitura/Kitura

Kitura is a free and open-source web framework written in Swift, developed by IBM and licensed under Apache License 2.0. It’s an HTTP server and web framework for writing Swift server applications.

In December 2019, IBM announced it had no further plans to develop the Kitura framework. As of January 2020, work on server-side Swift was discontinued at IBM. In September 2020, Kitura transitioned to be a community-run project however it struggled to gain traction within the developer community and so is no longer under active development.

== Features ==
- URL routing (GET, POST, PUT, DELETE)
- URL parameters
- Static file serving
- FastCGI support
- JSON parsing
- Pluggable middleware

== See also ==
- Vapor (web framework)
