= Jussara, Bahia =

Municipality of Bahia, Brazil

Coordinates: 11°02′49″S 41°58′08″W

Jussara, Bahia Chapada do Jacaré
- Municipality
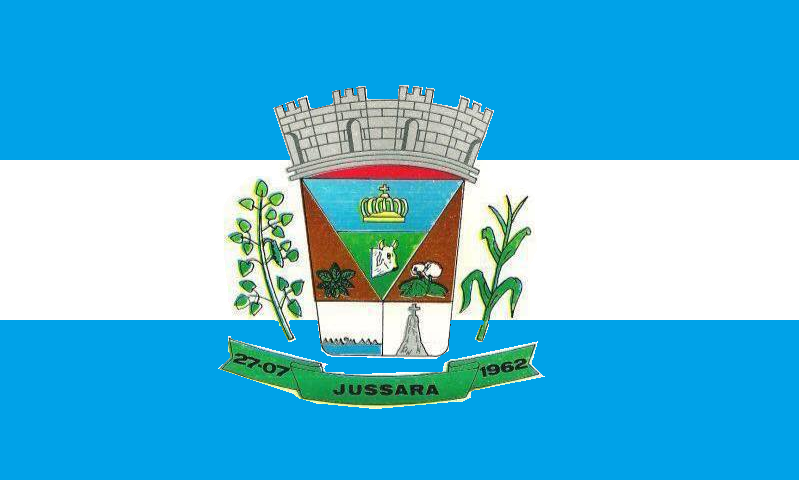
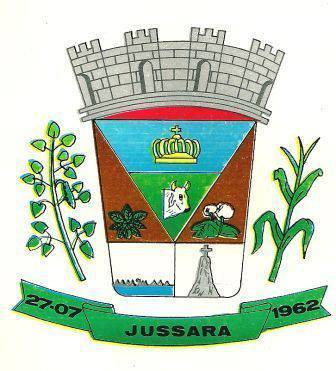
- Flag Coat of arms
- Interactive map of Jussara, Bahia
- Country: Brazil
- Region: Northeast Region
- State: Bahia

Population (2020)
  - Total: 15,262
- Time zone: UTC−3 (BRT)

Jussara, Bahia is a municipality in the state of Bahia in the North-East region of Brazil.

== See also ==
- List of municipalities in Bahia
