= XLA (singer) =

Canadian singer

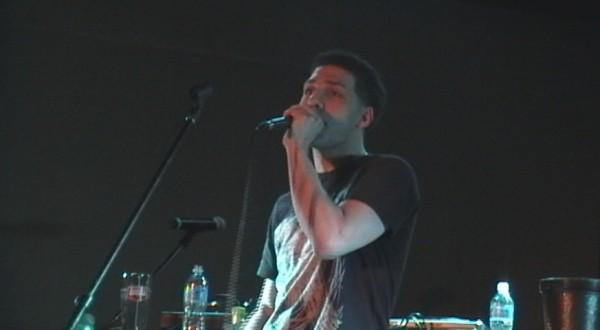
- XLA performing in Ottawa, Ontario, Canada in 2009

Background information
- Born: Joseph Achakji; February 11, 1981 (age 45); Kingston, Ontario, Canada
- Genres: EDM, Urban, urban-world, fusion
- Occupations: Singer, songwriter, record producer, musician
- Instruments: Vocals, guitar, keyboards, drums and tabla
- Years active: 1997–present
- Label: XWide Tidals Inc.
- Website: www.xlamusic.com

Joseph Achakji (born February 11, 1981) and better known by his stage name XLA is a Canadian urban indie artist and more recently an Electronic dance music (EDM) artist of Egyptian origin In 2006, he also established the independent music production and record label XWide Tidals. He sings mainly in French and English, but also occasionally in Spanish and Arabic. He has collaborated with a number of EDM DJs and producers notably in Mexico (EMPO) and Spain (Blanco y Negro). Besides vocals, he plays guitar, piano, keyboards, drums and tabla. He is also a digital marketer and manages a number of up and coming artists.

== Career ==
In 2002, he was the "Pop Star" competition winner in Ottawa organized by the University of Ottawa where Achakji studied engineering. He graduated with a bachelor's degree in electrical engineering in 2004 with a management option. However, he decided to pursue a musical career. In his YouTube page, he explains his artistic name was originally BETO XL and that he chose the letters X-L-A as pronounced English – French – world languages as to represent a fusion of cultures and representing his personal conviction of "do what you love and always excel".

XLA performs in a music style he calls "Urbaine-Monde" (Urban-World). His debut album was Nouvel Autrefois that was released in 2007 on XWide Tidals record label and distributed by Sizzle-Distribution Select. The album has Latin, Middle Eastern, Reggaeton and World-Urban influences. The single "Quoi Faire" taken from the album was nominated in 2009 for Best Video Clip at the Trille Or awards gala, and XLA nominated for Best New Discovery and Best Singer-Songwriter. Other notable singles / videos from the album include "Jusqu'à Demain" and "J'aime Jammer". He is a member of Association des Professionnel de la Chanson et de la Musique (APCM), L'Union des Artistes (UDA), Society of Composers, Authors and Music Publishers of Canada (SOCAN), Société Canadienne de Gestion du Droit de Reproduction (SODRAC).

Festivals and events

In addition to many gigs in various cities around Canada, XLA has taken part in a number of festivals and public events including:

- "Francofêtes en Acadie" in November 2009, broadcast on Radio-Canada's Première Chaîne on December 16, 2009, Francofêtes 2009 in Harbourfront area in Toronto, Ontario and Francofêtes 2010 in Kingston, Ontario. He also performed three times at the Melkite Festival in Montreal in 2007, 2008 and 2010.
- XLA was part of a group of 12 North American French-speaking artists that took part between June 2009 and April 2010 in workshops organized jointly by Society of Composers, Authors and Music Publishers of Canada (SOCAN), l'Union des Artistes (UDA) and Alliance National de l'Industrie Musicale (ANIM) in Petite Vallée and Montreal in (Quebec) and Moncton in New Brunswick and taking part in "Festival en Chanson" and "Vue sur la Relève"
- In 2010, he took part in the "Festival Quand Ça Nous Chante" broadcast by Radio-Canada
- XLA also recorded a live concert for TFO television program "En Concert" broadcast in November 2010.

== XWide Tidals ==
XWide Tidals is a music publishing and record label established in 2006 by Joseph Achakji (XLA) for release of his own materials and those of other artists. It also expanded into music video production and digital marketing. XWide Tidals was also selected to represent the province of Quebec at SXSW (South by South West) in Austin, Texas under the umbrella of "Planète Québec".

== Collaborations ==
- He collaborated in his debut album Nouvel Autrefois with the music producer Ghislain Brind'Amour. Nouvel Autrefois was recorded in Planet Studio in Montreal. Fernando Barrio also co-wrote and co-produced the album.
- In 2007, his single "Angle Obtus" featured Jérôme-Philippe Bélinga (aka Disoul of the French Quebec group Dubmatique)
- In 2014, he collaborated with Mexican EDM artist DJ J Zuart on the Mexican label EMPO with XLA being featured on DJ J Zuart's "I Believe". The track was chosen as part of the 2014 Mexican compilation Top Chart Summer Edition. This was followed in May 2016 by another EDM collaboration this time with Italian DJs / producers Ticli & Gas in the single "From Here" on the Spanish Blanco y Negro label, with an accompanying music video produced by XWide Tidals and directed by XLA himself.

== Awards and nominations ==
- In 2005, he was the recipient of a grant from Ontario Arts Council in the "shows" category and again in November 2007 in category for "music videos" Best Music Video and Best Singer-Songwriter both for the single "Quoi Faire", and Best New Discovered Artist 2009 and Best Album cover both for the album Nouvel Autrefois.
- In 2008, Alliance National de l'Industrie Musicale (ANIM) selected XLA to represent Ontario among its 12 Canadian Francophone artists nominated one from each province to take part in an artist mentorship and development program "Les Rencontres Qui Chantent". During that time, he composed the song "On Est Là" which was performed in "Le Village en chanson de Petite-Vallée", during "Les Franco-Fêtes de l'Acadie" and "Vue Sur La Relève" in Montreal. The song aired on Radio Canada nationally.
- In April 2009, he also won second prize for "J'aime Jammer Remix" at the "International Riffstar Hottest Song 2009 Competition"
- In September 2009, he was chosen "Artist of the Year" for "excellence in music – vocal technique, classical guitar and piano" at École de Musique Culture X.
- In 2010, the single "J'aime Jammer Reggaeton Remix" won the second place on the Riffstar Hottest Song Contest 2010 held in New York, NY
- In January 2011, his song "On Est Là" was nominated for Radio-Canada Prize for "Best Song" at the Trille Or 2011 gala.

== In popular culture ==
- XLA's "Jusqu'à demain" was included in 2009 La Compilation Trille Or album alongside contributions of finalists to the "Trille Or" awards
- XLA took part in "Chantez Moi Vos 20 Ans" on the occasion of Association des professionnels de la chanson (APCM) 20th anniversary broadcast in a special program on "Radio-Canada Ottawa-Gatineau".
- He has been interviewed on several cultural programs including in "Bonté Divine" (Radio-Canada), "Musimission" (TFO), "EntreAct" (Tele-Rogers).

== Discography ==
=== Albums ===
- 2007:Nouvel Autrefois

Tracklist

1. "Je Verse"
2. "J'aime Jammer"
3. "Donne Moi de la Place"
4. "Jusqu'à Demain"
5. "Angle Obtus"
6. "Pas le Droit"
7. "Quoi Faire"
8. "Elle Pleure Dehors"
9. "Culture Émotionnelle"
10. "Trésor"
11. "La Scène"
12. "La Freedom"
13. "Long Soupir"
14. "Jaime Jammer Remix"

=== Singles ===
- 2005: "J'aime Jammer"
- 2006: "J'aime Jammer remix" (produced by Red Hook)
- 2007: "Angle Obtus" (feat. Jérôme-Philippe Bélinga aka Disoul of Dubmatique)
- 2010: "On Est Là"

Featured in

- 2010: "Fanmi Sé Fanmi" (Elby & Woods with Dramatik & XLA)
- 2014: "I Believe" (J Zuart feat. XLA) [EMPO]
- 2016: "From Here" (Ticli & Gas feat. XLA) [Blanco y Negro]

=== Compilations ===
- 2009: XLA's song "Jusqu'à Demain" appears in La Compilations Trille Or as track #18. The release is a collection of songs of finalists to the Trille Or Awards
- 2014: "I Believe" by DJ J Zuart featuring XLA appears on the 2014 Mexican compilation Top Chart Summer Edition

== Videography ==
- 2007: "La Scène"
- 2008: "Quoi Faire"
- 2010: "On Est Là"
- 2016: "From Here" (Ticli & Gas feat. XLA)

== Sources ==
- PodJerky: Digital Marketing specialist Joe Achakji
