= Jussara M. Almeida =

Brazilian computer scientist

Jussara Marques de Almeida (born 11 December 1973) is a Brazilian computer scientist whose research involves social computing, including web caches, user modeling, and the analysis of workload patterns arising from user interactions. She is an associate professor of computer science at the Federal University of Minas Gerais.

== Education and career ==
Almeida earned bachelor's and master's degrees in computer science at the Federal University of Minas Gerais, in 1994 and 1997 respectively. She continued her graduate study at the University of Wisconsin–Madison, earning a second master's degree in 1999 and completing her Ph.D. in computer science in 2003. Her dissertation, Streaming Content Distribution Networks with Minimum Delivery Cost, was supervised by Mary K. Vernon.

She returned to the Federal University of Minas Gerais as an assistant professor in 2004, and became an associate professor in 2012.

== Recognition ==
Almeida was an affiliate member of the Brazilian Academy of Sciences from 2011 to 2015.
