= Vapor (web framework) =

Open-source web framework written in Swift

- Developers: Tanner Nelson and others
- Release: January 18, 2016; 10 years ago
- Stable release: 4.102.1 / July 10, 2024; 2 years ago
- Written in: Swift
- Operating system: macOS, Ubuntu
- Platform: SwiftNIO
- Type: Web framework
- License: MIT License
- Website: vapor.codes

Vapor is an open source web framework written in Swift and designed for Swift development. It can be used to create RESTful APIs, web apps, and real-time applications using WebSockets. In addition to the core framework, Vapor provides an ORM, a templating language, and packages to facilitate user authentication and authorization.

Vapor's source code is hosted on GitHub and licensed under the MIT License. Vapor has been a part of Swift's Server APIs working group since 2016.

== History ==
Vapor 0.1.0 was released as a proof of concept for Swift on the server a month after Apple open sourced Swift and began Linux platform support on December 3, 2015. Vapor 1.0 arrived in September 2016, followed by the release of Vapor 2.0 in May 2017.

The framework was rewritten for Vapor 3.0 to be built on Apple's non-blocking networking framework SwiftNIO. Vapor 3 was released in May 2018. Apple cited the speed with which Vapor (along with Kitura) adopted the new SwiftNIO framework on the main Swift.org server page.

Vapor 3's beta period saw educational material published by Packt, Paul Hudson, Razeware LLC, and lynda.com. Vapor was recognized by Swift.org with an official Swift Forum in its inaugural group of Related Projects in May 2018.

Vapor 4's Alpha 1 Release started in May 2019 and the stable version released in April 2020.

=== Releases ===
Version	Release date	Swift version
1.0	Sep 15, 2016	≥ 3.0
2.0	May 17, 2017	≥ 3.1
3.0	May 4, 2018	≥ 4.1
4.0	April 9, 2020	≥ 5.2
5.0	TBD	≥ TBD

Legend:
Unsupported
Supported
Latest version
Preview version
Future version

Source: Vapor Docs & GitHub Releases.

=== Swift version support ===
Vapor 4 supports the last 3 minor Swift versions. As of October 27th 2023, this includes Swift 5.7, Swift 5.8 and Swift 5.9.

This meets the standards set out by the Swift Server Workgroup, of which Vapor is a member

== Features ==
Vapor supports the following features:

- Async / non-blocking IO
- Authentication: basic, bearer, JWT, and password
- Cache: Redis and in-memory
- Commands / console formatting
- Content negotiation: JSON, multipart, and URL-encoded form
- Crypto: RNG, ciphers, digests, RSA
- Dependency Injection / Inversion of Control
- Fluent ORM: MySQL, PostgreSQL, MongoDB and SQLite
- HTTP client and server
- Leaf templating: HTML etc.
- Logging
- URL routing
- Validation
- WebSocket client and server
- Queue jobs
