= Mary K. Vernon =

American computer scientist (born 1953)

Mary Katherine Vernon (born 1953) is an American computer scientist who works as a professor of computer science and industrial engineering at the University of Wisconsin–Madison. Her research concerns high-performance computer architecture and streaming media.

Vernon graduated from the University of California, Los Angeles in 1975 with a B.S. in chemistry, and earned her Ph.D. in computer science from UCLA in 1983 under the supervision of Gerald Estrin. She was named a Fellow of the Association for Computing Machinery in 1996 "for fundamental contributions to performance analysis of parallel computer architectures and for leadership in the computing research community." In 2019, she won the ACM SIGMETRICS Achievement award for "contributions to analytic performance modeling techniques and to analytic design of a wide range of impactful computer and communication system architectures."

== Selected publications ==
- Holliday, Mark A.; Vernon, Mary K. (December 1987), "A generalized timed Petri net model for performance analysis", IEEE Transactions on Software Engineering, SE-13 (12): 1297–1310, Bibcode:1987ITSEn..13.1297H, doi:10.1109/TSE.1987.233141, hdl:1793/10030, S2CID 18145031.
- Goodman, James R.; Vernon, Mary K.; Woest, Philip J. (1989), "Efficient synchronization primitives for large-scale cache-coherent multiprocessors", Proceedings of the Third International Conference on Architectural Support for Programming Languages and Operating Systems (ASPLOS III) (PDF), New York, NY, USA: ACM, pp. 64–75, doi:10.1145/70082.68188, ISBN 978-0-89791-300-3, S2CID 7422600.
- Leutenegger, Scott T.; Vernon, Mary K. (1990), "The performance of multiprogrammed multiprocessor scheduling algorithms", Proceedings of the 1990 ACM SIGMETRICS Conference on Measurement and Modeling of Computer Systems (SIGMETRICS '90), New York, NY, USA: ACM, pp. 226–236, doi:10.1145/98457.98761, ISBN 978-0-89791-359-1, S2CID 16440752.
- Almeida, Jussara M.; Krueger, Jeffrey; Eager, Derek L.; Vernon, Mary K. (2001), "Analysis of educational media server workloads", Proceedings of the 11th International Workshop on Network and Operating Systems Support for Digital Audio and Video (NOSSDAV '01), New York, NY, USA: ACM, pp. 21–30, doi:10.1145/378344.378348, ISBN 978-1-58113-370-7, S2CID 5398367.
