= The Raimones =

AI generated punk rock music based on The Ramones

The Raimones (stylized as THE RAiMONES) is a 2017 generative music project that utilized artificial intelligence to compose music in the style of the American punk rock band The Ramones. Developed by Matthias Frey, a researcher at Sony CSL Tokyo, the project was an early experiment in applying deep learning to high-energy, minimalist musical genres.

== Technical Development ==
The project utilized Long short-term memory (LSTM) recurrent neural networks to generate musical structures and lyrics.

The model was trained on a dataset consisting of 130 Ramones songs in MIDI format and the band's complete lyrical catalog. The technical framework was built using Python and Jupyter Notebook, drawing influence from the character-level RNN text generation models popularized by Andrej Karpathy. Unlike contemporary AI music projects that focused on the harmonic complexities of classical or pop music, THE RAiMONES sought to determine if neural networks could replicate the "1-2-3-4" rhythmic consistency and formulaic nature of early punk.

== "I'm Alive" ==
The primary output of the project was the song "I'm Alive," released in 2017. The work is described as a form of "augmented intelligence," a hybrid approach where the AI provides the compositional foundation and human musicians handle the arrangement and performance.

The song was recorded by the musician Mr. Ratboy (Gilbert Avondet). Avondet's involvement provided a stylistic link to the subject material, as he had previously served as a touring guitarist for Marky Ramone and the Intruders in 1996. The project's discography has since been made available on major streaming platforms, including Apple Music.

== Reception and Significance ==
The project has been cited as a "proof of concept" for AI's ability to tackle "noisy" and aggressive aesthetics. In 2019, the Belgian magazine Knack Focus profiled the project alongside other AI pioneers such as Holly Herndon, noting the project's attempt to recreate the sound of "deceased legends" while maintaining a distinct, machine-like quality. It has also been featured in academic settings, such as at UC Santa Cruz, as a case study for AI-driven genre mimicry.
