= LSTM (disambiguation) =

LSTM is long short-term memory, an artificial neural network.

LSTM may also refer to:

- Liverpool School of Tropical Medicine, a higher education institution in Liverpool, UK
- Land Surface Temperature Monitoring, a satellite of the Copernicus Programme

== See also ==
- Time-aware long short-term memory (T-LSTM)
