= Felix Gers =

Computer scientist

- Occupation: Professor of computer science
- Employer: Berlin University of Applied Sciences
- Known for: Introducing the forget gate to LSTM architecture
- Notable work: Research in recurrent neural networks

Felix Gers is a professor of computer science at Berlin University of Applied Sciences Berlin. With Jürgen Schmidhuber and Fred Cummins, he introduced the forget gate to the long short-term memory recurrent neural network architecture. This modification of the original architecture has been shown to be crucial to the success of the LSTM at such tasks as speech and handwriting recognition.
