= Time-aware long short-term memory =

Time-aware LSTM (T-LSTM) is a long short-term memory (LSTM) unit capable of handling irregular time intervals in longitudinal patient records. T-LSTM was developed by researchers from Michigan State University, IBM Research, and Cornell University and was first presented in the Knowledge Discovery and Data Mining (KDD) conference. Experiments using real and synthetic data proved that T-LSTM auto-encoder outperformed widely used frameworks including LSTM and MF1-LSTM auto-encoders.
