= Kyunghyun Cho =

American and South Korean computer scientist (born 1985)

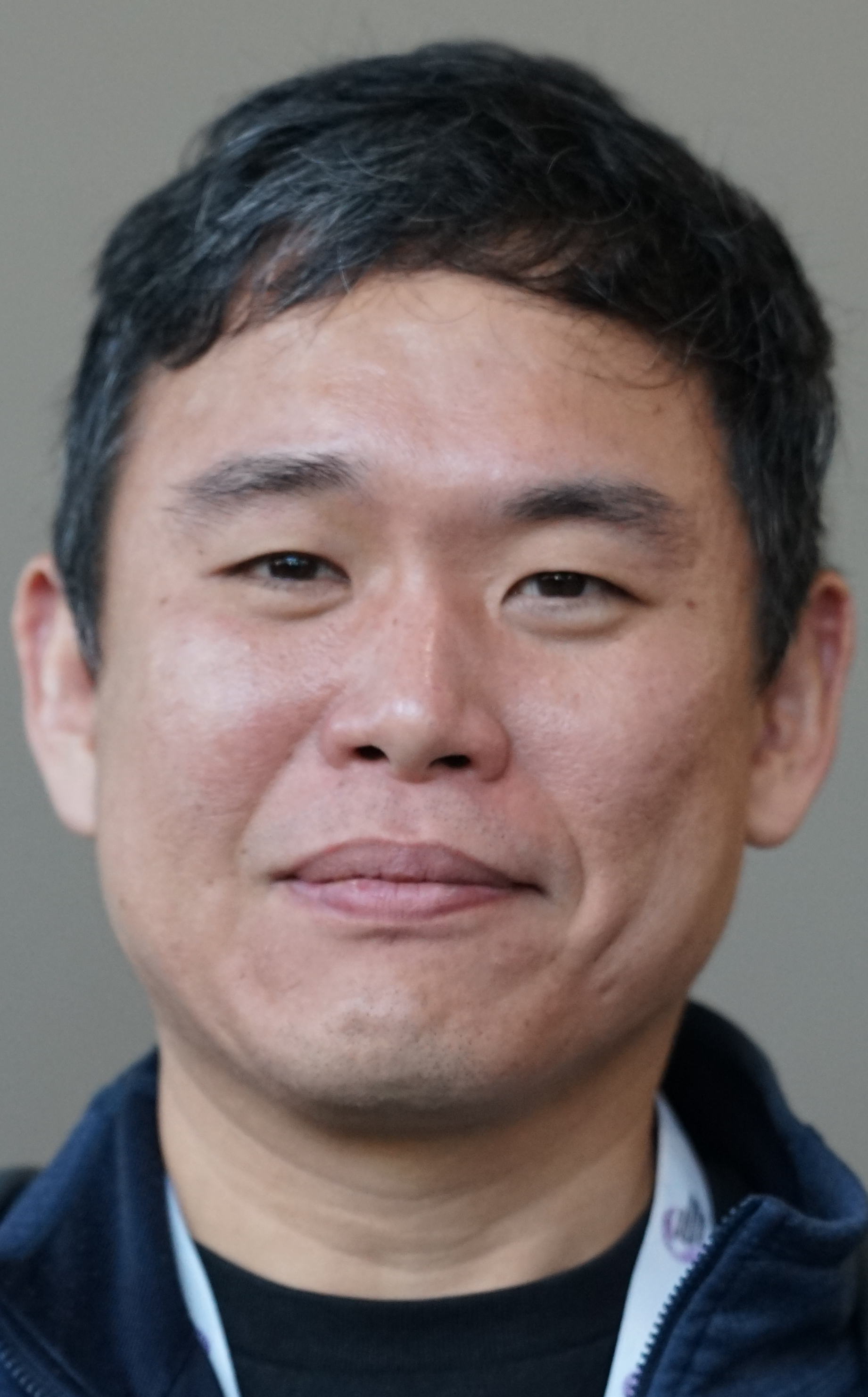
- Cho at NeurIPS in 2025
- Born: 1985 (age 40–41); South Korea
- Citizenship: United States; South Korea

Academic background
- Education: KAIST (B.Sc); Aalto University (M.Sc, D.Sc)

Academic work
- Discipline: Machine learning, deep learning, natural language processing
- Institutions: New York University

Korean name
- Hangul: 조경현
- RR: Jo Gyeonghyeon
- MR: Cho Kyŏnghyŏn
- Website: kyunghyuncho.me

Kyunghyun Cho (Korean: 조경현; born 1985) is an American and South Korean computer scientist. He is a professor of Computer Science and Data Science at New York University's Courant Institute School of Mathematics, Computing, and Data Science. He has also been the Glen de Vries Professor of Health Statistics since 2025.

Cho is a researcher in machine learning, especially deep learning. He was a coauthor on a 2014 paper that introduced neural machine translation.

== Biography ==
Cho was born in 1985 in South Korea to father Kyu-Ick Cho (조규익), a professor of Korean literature at Soongsil University, and mother Im Mi-Sook, a Korean language teacher. His mother retired from teaching to focus on raising Cho and his younger brother. He grew up in Seoul.

Cho received his Bachelor of Science in Computer Science from KAIST in South Korea in 2009. He received his Master of Science in Machine Learning and Data Mining and Doctor of Science from Aalto University in Finland in 2011 and 2014 respectively. He then was a postdoctoral fellow at the Université de Montréal, where he studied under Yoshua Bengio until the summer of 2015. In 2014, Cho coauthored a paper with Dzmitry Bahdanau and Bengio that introduced neural machine translation and attention for neural networks, concepts that have since become highly influential in machine learning.

In 2015, he joined the faculty of Courant Institute School of Mathematics, Computing, and Data Science at New York University (NYU). In 2019, he was granted tenure and made a professor of Computer Science and Data Science at NYU. He was a research scientist at Facebook AI Research from 2017 to 2020.

In 2024, he became co-head of the Global AI Frontier Lab at NYU with Yann LeCun. In 2025, he was made the Glen de Vries Professor of Health Statistics by the Courant Institute.

== Awards ==
In 2020, he was named AI Researcher of the Year by the South Korean company Samsung. In 2021, he received the Samsung Ho-Am Prize for Engineering, one of South Korea's most prestigious awards for academics.

At some point, Cho renounced his South Korean citizenship. In 2025, the South Korean government granted Cho citizenship again, in recognition of his contributions to artificial intelligence.

== Philanthropy ==
Cho donated the $30,000 he received with Samsung AI Researcher of the Year award to the research institute Mila to support female students studying computer science from abroad.

The Ho-Am Prize came with prize money of ₩300 million (before taxes; around $257,000). Cho donated much of this money to establish several scholarships and awards. He donated €30,000 ($33,600) to Aalto University to support female students from outside the European Union studying computer science. Cho donated ₩100 million ($85,800) each to KAIST to establish a Lim Mi-Sook Scholarship (임미숙 장학금), which is named for his mother and meant to support female engineers. Another ₩100 million was spent to establish a Baek-Gyu Award for Scholarly Award for Classics. The award, named in honor of the art name of his literature scholar father, is for researchers in Korean classical literature and art.
