= Artificial neuron =

Mathematical function conceived as a crude model

Artificial neuron structure

An artificial neuron is a mathematical function conceived as a model of a biological neuron in a neural network. The artificial neuron is the elementary unit of an artificial neural network.

The design of the artificial neuron was inspired by biological neural circuitry. Its inputs are analogous to excitatory postsynaptic potentials and inhibitory postsynaptic potentials at neural dendrites, or activation. Its weights are analogous to synaptic weights, and its output is analogous to a neuron's action potential which is transmitted along its axon.

Usually, each input is separately weighted, and the sum is often added to a term known as a bias (loosely corresponding to the threshold potential), before being passed through a nonlinear function known as an activation function. Depending on the task, these functions could have a sigmoid shape (e.g. for binary classification), but they may also take the form of other nonlinear functions, piecewise linear functions, or step functions. They are also often monotonically increasing, continuous, differentiable, and bounded. Non-monotonic, unbounded, and oscillating activation functions with multiple zeros that outperform sigmoidal and ReLU-like activation functions on many tasks have also been recently explored. The threshold function has inspired building logic gates referred to as threshold logic; applicable to building logic circuits resembling brain processing. For example, new devices such as memristors have been extensively used to develop such logic.

The artificial neuron activation function should not be confused with a linear system's transfer function.

An artificial neuron may be referred to as a semi-linear unit, Nv neuron, binary neuron, linear threshold function, or McCulloch–Pitts (MCP) neuron, depending on the structure used.

Simple artificial neurons, such as the McCulloch–Pitts model, are sometimes described as "caricature models", since they are intended to reflect one or more neurophysiological observations, but without regard to realism. Artificial neurons can also refer to artificial cells in neuromorphic engineering that are similar to natural physical neurons.

== Basic structure ==
For a given artificial neuron $k$, let there be $m+1$ inputs with signals $x_0$ through $x_m$ and weights $w_{k0}$ through $w_{km}$. Usually, the input $x_0$ is assigned the value +1, which makes it a bias input with $w_{k0} = b_k$. This leaves only $m$ actual inputs to the neuron: $x_1$ to $x_m$.

The output of the $k$-th neuron is:

$$y_k = \varphi \left(\sum_{j=0}^m w_{kj} x_j \right)$$,

where $\varphi$ (phi) is the activation function.

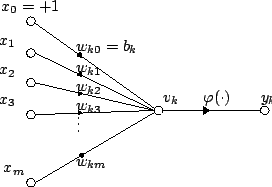

The output is analogous to the axon of a biological neuron, and its value propagates to the input of the next layer, through a synapse. It may also exit the system, possibly as part of an output vector.

It has no learning process as such. Its activation function weights are calculated, and its threshold value is predetermined.

== McCulloch–Pitts (MCP) neuron ==
An MCP neuron is a kind of restricted artificial neuron which operates in discrete time-steps. Each has zero or more inputs, and are written as $x_1, ..., x_n$. It has one output, written as $y$. Each input can be either excitatory or inhibitory. The output can either be quiet or firing. An MCP neuron also has a threshold $b \in \{0, 1, 2, ...\}$.

In an MCP neural network, all the neurons operate in synchronous discrete time-steps of $t = 0, 1, 2, 3, ...$. At time $t+1$, the output of the neuron is $y(t+1) = 1$ if the number of firing excitatory inputs is at least equal to the threshold, and no inhibitory inputs are firing; $y(t+1)=0$ otherwise.

It can be used to represent linearly separable boolean functions (for example, AND, OR, NOR) but not, for example, XOR.

Each output can be the input to an arbitrary number of neurons, including itself (i.e., self-loops are possible). However, an output cannot connect more than once with a single neuron. Self-loops do not cause contradictions, since the network operates in synchronous discrete time-steps.

As a simple example, consider a single neuron with threshold 0, and a single inhibitory self-loop. Its output would oscillate between 0 and 1 at every step, acting as a "clock".

Any finite state machine can be simulated by a MCP neural network. Furnished with an infinite tape, MCP neural networks can simulate any Turing machine.

== Biological models ==
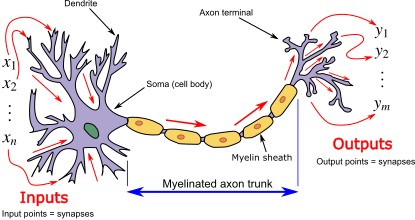
Neuron and myelinated axon, with signal flow from inputs at dendrites to outputs at axon terminals

Artificial neurons are designed to mimic aspects of their biological counterparts. However a significant performance gap exists between biological and artificial neural networks. In particular single biological neurons in the human brain with oscillating activation function capable of learning the XOR function have been discovered.

- Dendrites – in biological neurons, dendrites act as the input vector. These dendrites allow the cell to receive signals from a large (>1000) number of neighboring neurons. As in the above mathematical treatment, each dendrite is able to perform "multiplication" by that dendrite's "weight value." The multiplication is accomplished by increasing or decreasing the ratio of synaptic neurotransmitters to signal chemicals introduced into the dendrite in response to the synaptic neurotransmitter. A negative multiplication effect can be achieved by transmitting signal inhibitors (i.e. oppositely charged ions) along the dendrite in response to the reception of synaptic neurotransmitters.
- Soma – in biological neurons, the soma acts as the summation function, seen in the above mathematical description. As positive and negative signals (exciting and inhibiting, respectively) arrive in the soma from the dendrites, the positive and negative ions are effectively added in summation, by simple virtue of being mixed together in the solution inside the cell's body.
- Axon – the axon gets its signal from the summation behavior which occurs inside the soma. The opening to the axon essentially samples the electrical potential of the solution inside the soma. Once the soma reaches a certain potential, the axon will transmit an all-in signal pulse down its length. In this regard, the axon behaves as the ability for us to connect our artificial neuron to other artificial neurons.

Unlike most artificial neurons, however, biological neurons fire in discrete pulses. Each time the electrical potential inside the soma reaches a certain threshold, a pulse is transmitted down the axon. This pulsing can be translated into continuous values. The rate (activations per second, etc.) at which an axon fires converts directly into the rate at which neighboring cells get signal ions introduced into them. The faster a biological neuron fires, the faster nearby neurons accumulate electrical potential (or lose electrical potential, depending on the "weighting" of the dendrite that connects to the neuron that fired). It is this conversion that allows computer scientists and mathematicians to simulate biological neural networks using artificial neurons which can output distinct values (often from −1 to 1).

=== Encoding ===
Research has shown that unary coding is used in the neural circuits responsible for birdsong production. The use of unary in biological networks is presumably due to the inherent simplicity of the coding. Another contributing factor could be that unary coding provides a certain degree of error correction.

== Physical artificial cells ==
There is research and development into physical artificial neurons — organic and inorganic.

For example, some artificial neurons can receive and release dopamine (chemical signals rather than electrical signals) and communicate with natural rat muscle and brain cells, with potential for use in BCIs/prosthetics.

Low-power biocompatible memristors may enable construction of artificial neurons which function at voltages of biological action potentials and could be used to directly process biosensing signals, for neuromorphic computing and/or direct communication with biological neurons.

Organic neuromorphic circuits made out of polymers, coated with an ion-rich gel to enable a material to carry an electric charge like real neurons, have been built into a robot, enabling it to learn sensorimotorically within the real world, rather than via simulations or virtually. Moreover, artificial spiking neurons made of soft matter (polymers) can operate in biologically relevant environments and enable the synergetic communication between the artificial and biological domains.

== History ==
The artificial neuron was first proposed by Warren McCulloch and Walter Pitts in their 1943 paper "A Logical Calculus of the Ideas Immanent in Nervous Activity". It was called the Threshold Logic Unit or Linear Threshold Unit. The model was specifically targeted as a computational model of the "nerve net" in the brain. As an activation function, it employed a threshold, equivalent to using the Heaviside step function. Initially, only a simple model was considered, with binary inputs and outputs, some restrictions on the possible weights, and a more flexible threshold value. Since the beginning it was already noticed that any Boolean function could be implemented by networks of such devices, what is easily seen from the fact that one can implement the AND and OR functions, and use them in the disjunctive or the conjunctive normal form. Researchers also soon realized that cyclic networks, with feedbacks through neurons, could define dynamical systems with memory, but most of the research concentrated (and still does) on strictly feed-forward networks because of the smaller difficulty they present.

One important and pioneering artificial neural network that used the linear threshold function was the perceptron, developed by Frank Rosenblatt. This model already considered more flexible weight values in the neurons, and was used in machines with adaptive capabilities. The representation of the threshold values as a bias term was introduced by Bernard Widrow in 1960 – see ADALINE.

A further development was the Hebbian Learning Rule, proposed by Donald O. Hebb, which provided a fundamental rule for adjusting the weights in neural networks. The principle of Hebbian learning posits that the connection between two neurons strengthens if they activate simultaneously and weakens if they activate separately. A refinement of Hebbian learning, known as spike-timing-dependent plasticity, was developed to account for the precise timing of neuron spikes. This form of learning has been implemented in spiking neural networks, which are believed to be more energy-efficient than traditional ANNs and require less energy for transmission since they process data based on the occurrence of events rather than continuous computation.

In the late 1980s, when research on neural networks regained strength, neurons with more continuous shapes started to be considered. The possibility of differentiating the activation function allows the direct use of the gradient descent and other optimization algorithms for the adjustment of the weights. Neural networks also started to be used as a general function approximation model. The best known training algorithm called backpropagation has been rediscovered several times but its first development goes back to the work of Paul Werbos.

== Types of activation function ==
The activation function of a neuron is chosen to have a number of properties which either enhance or simplify the network containing the neuron. Crucially, for instance, any multilayer perceptron using a linear activation function has an equivalent single-layer network; a non-linear function is therefore necessary to gain the advantages of a multi-layer network.

Below, $u$ refers in all cases to the weighted sum of all the inputs to the neuron, i.e. for $n$ inputs,

$$u = \sum_{i=1}^n w_i x_i$$

where $w$ is a vector of synaptic weights and $x$ is a vector of inputs.

=== Step function ===
The output $y$ of this activation function is binary, depending on whether the input meets a specified threshold, $\theta$ (theta). The "signal" is sent, i.e. the output is set to 1, if the activation meets or exceeds the threshold.

$$y = \begin{cases} 1 & \text{if }u \ge \theta \\ 0 & \text{if }u < \theta \end{cases}$$

This function is used in perceptrons, and appears in many other models. It performs a division of the space of inputs by a hyperplane. It is specially useful in the last layer of a network, intended for example to perform binary classification of the inputs.

=== Linear combination ===
In this case, the output unit is simply the weighted sum of its inputs, plus a bias term. A number of such linear neurons perform a linear transformation of the input vector. This is usually more useful in the early layers of a network. A number of analysis tools exist based on linear models, such as harmonic analysis, and they can all be used in neural networks with this linear neuron. The bias term allows us to make affine transformations to the data.

=== Sigmoid ===
A fairly simple nonlinear function, the sigmoid function such as the logistic function also has an easily calculated derivative, which can be important when calculating the weight updates in the network. It thus makes the network more easily manipulable mathematically, and was attractive to early computer scientists who needed to minimize the computational load of their simulations. It was previously commonly seen in multilayer perceptrons. However, recent work has shown sigmoid neurons to be less effective than rectified linear neurons. The reason is that the gradients computed by the backpropagation algorithm tend to diminish towards zero as activations propagate through layers of sigmoidal neurons, making it difficult to optimize neural networks using multiple layers of sigmoidal neurons.

=== Rectifier ===
In the context of artificial neural networks, the rectifier or rectified linear unit is an activation function defined as the positive part of its argument:

$$f(x) = x^+ = \max(0, x),$$

where $x$ is the input to a neuron. This is also known as a ramp function and is analogous to half-wave rectification in electrical engineering. This activation function was first introduced to a dynamical network by Hahnloser et al. in a 2000 paper in Nature with strong biological motivations and mathematical justifications. It has been demonstrated for the first time in 2011 to enable better training of deeper networks, compared to the widely used activation functions prior to 2011, i.e., the logistic sigmoid (which is inspired by probability theory; see logistic regression) and its more practical counterpart, the hyperbolic tangent.

A commonly used variant of the rectified linear unit activation function is the leaky rectified linear unit which allows a small, positive gradient when the unit is not active:

$$f(x) = \begin{cases}
x & \text{if } x > 0, \\
ax & \text{otherwise}.
\end{cases}$$

where $x$ is the input to the neuron and $a$ is a small positive constant (set to 0.01 in the original paper).

== Pseudocode algorithm ==
The following is a simple pseudocode implementation of a single Threshold Logic Unit which takes Boolean inputs (true or false), and returns a single Boolean output when activated. An object-oriented model is used. No method of training is defined, since several exist. If a purely functional model were used, the class Threshold Logic Unit below would be replaced with a function Threshold Logic Unit with input parameters threshold, weights, and inputs that returned a Boolean value.

class Threshold Logic Unit defined as:
    data member threshold : number
    data member weights : list of numbers of size X

    function member fire(inputs : list of booleans of size X) : boolean defined as:
        variable T : number
        T ← 0
        for each i in 1 to X do
            if inputs(i) is true then
                T ← T + weights(i)
            end if
        end for each
        if T > threshold then
            return true
        else:
            return false
        end if
    end function
end class

== See also ==
- Binding neuron
- Connectionism
- Receptron
