= Paul Werbos =

American social scientist and machine learning pioneer (born 1947)

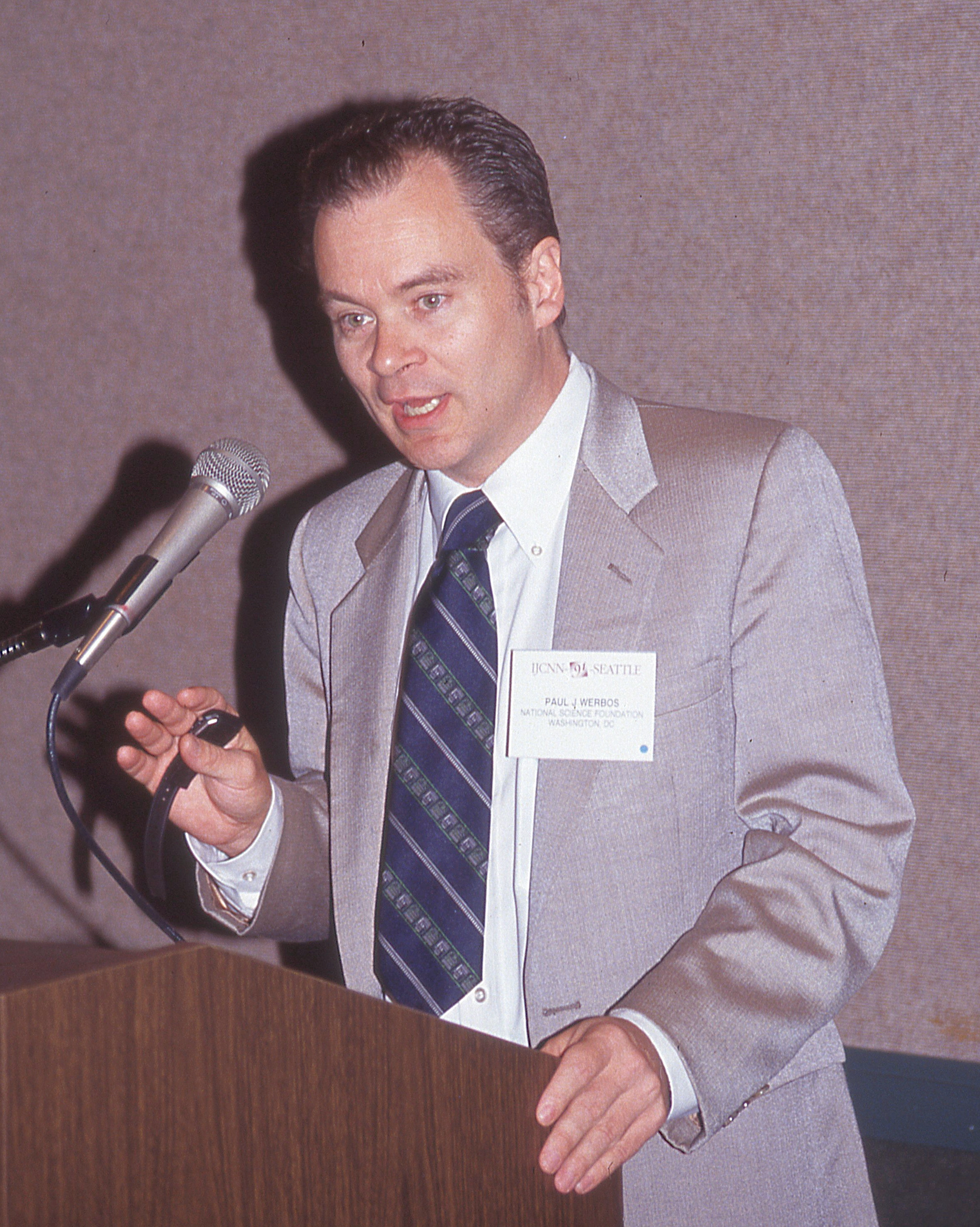
- Paul Werbos at the International Joint Conference on Neural Networks (IJCNN) in Seattle on July 8, 1991
- Born: Paul John Werbos; September 4, 1947 (age 79)
- Education: Harvard University
- Known for: Backpropagation
- Awards: IEEE Neural Network Pioneer Award (1995); IEEE Frank Rosenblatt Award (2022)
- Scientific career
- Fields: Social science; machine learning
- Workplaces: International Neural Network Society; National Science Foundation
- Thesis: Beyond Regression: New Tools for Prediction and Analysis in the Behavioral Sciences (1974)
- Doctoral advisor: Karl Deutsch
- Other academic advisors: Yu-Chi Ho
- Website: www.werbos.com

Paul John Werbos (born September 4, 1947) is an American social scientist and machine learning pioneer. He is best known for his 1974 dissertation, which first described the process of training artificial neural networks through backpropagation of errors. He also was a pioneer of recurrent neural networks.

Werbos received two degrees in economics from Harvard University and the London School of Economics. He later went on to earn a M.S. and PhD from Harvard University.

Werbos was one of the original three two-year Presidents of the International Neural Network Society (INNS). In 1995, he was awarded the IEEE Neural Network Pioneer Award for the discovery of backpropagation and other basic neural network learning frameworks, such as Adaptive Dynamic Programming.

Werbos has also written on quantum mechanics and other areas of physics. He also has interest in larger questions relating to consciousness, the foundations of physics, and human potential. He has also written extensively on how climate change poses a threat to humanity.

He served as program director in the National Science Foundation for several years until 2015.
