= Walter Pitts =

American logician and computational neuroscientist (1923–1969)

- Born: Walter Harry Pitts Jr. April 23, 1923; Detroit, Michigan, U.S.
- Died: May 14, 1969 (aged 46); Cambridge, Massachusetts, U.S.
- Known for: "A Logical Calculus of the Ideas Immanent in Nervous Activity" (1943); Artificial neural networks; Artificial neurons; McCulloch–Pitts neuron
- Scientific career
- Fields: Logician

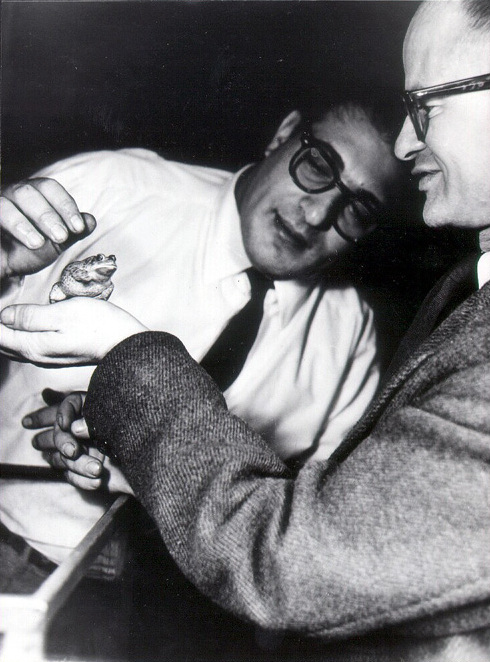
Walter Pitts (right) with Jerome Lettvin, co-author of the cognitive science paper "What the Frog's Eye Tells the Frog's Brain" (1959)

Walter Harry Pitts Jr. (April 23, 1923 – May 14, 1969) was an American logician who worked in the field of computational neuroscience. He proposed landmark theoretical formulations of neural activity and generative processes that influenced diverse fields such as cognitive sciences and psychology, philosophy, neurosciences, computer science, artificial neural networks, cybernetics and artificial intelligence, together with what has come to be known as the generative sciences. He is best remembered for having written, along with Warren Sturgis McCulloch, a seminal paper in scientific history, titled "A Logical Calculus of the Ideas Immanent in Nervous Activity" (1943). This paper proposed the first mathematical model of a neural network. The unit of this model, a simple formalized neuron, is still the standard of reference in the field of neural networks. It is often called a McCulloch–Pitts neuron. Prior to that paper, he formalized his ideas regarding the fundamental steps to building a Turing machine in the journal The Bulletin of Mathematical Biophysics in an essay titled "Some observations on the simple neuron circuit."

== Early life ==
Walter Harry Pitts Jr. was born in Detroit, Michigan, on April 23, 1923, the son of Walter and Marie Pitts (née Welsia). An autodidact, he taught himself logic and mathematics as a child and became a proficient reader in several languages, including Greek and Latin.

Friends of Pitts told the story that, at age 12, Pitts spent three days in a library reading Bertrand Russell's Principia Mathematica. A biographer, Neil R. Smalheiser, wrote that after reading it, "Pitts experienced a metaphysical insight that logic rules the universe, and as a corollary he felt that ego—and his ego in particular—needed to be erased in order to achieve an understanding of the world." According to friend Jerome Lettvin, Pitts sent a letter to Russell pointing out what he considered serious problems with the first half of the first volume, and Russell was appreciative and invited him to study at Cambridge University; the offer was not taken up, but Pitts did decide to become a logician.

At age 15 he left home to study and went to Chicago. Friends also told a potentially apocryphal story of Pitts meeting Russell for the first time after arriving in Chicago, having a conversation without realizing who Russell was, and impressing Russell.

== Academic career ==
At the age of 15 Pitts attended Russell's lectures at the University of Chicago. He stayed there, without registering as a student. While there, in 1938 he met Jerome Lettvin, a pre-medical student, and the two became close friends. Russell was a visiting professor at the University of Chicago in the fall of 1938, and he directed Pitts to study with the logician Rudolf Carnap. Pitts met Carnap at Chicago by walking into his office during office hours, and presenting him with an annotated version of Carnap's recent book on logic, The Logical Syntax of Language. Since Pitts did not introduce himself, Carnap spent months searching for him, and, when he found him, he obtained for him a menial job at the university and had Pitts study with him. Pitts at the time was homeless and without income. He mastered Carnap's abstract logic, then met with and was intrigued by the work of the Ukrainian mathematical physicist Nicolas Rashevsky, who was also at Chicago and was the founder of mathematical biophysics, remodeling biology on the structure of the physical sciences and mathematical logic. Pitts also worked closely with the mathematician Alston Scott Householder, who was a member of Rashevsky's group. During his studies under Carnap, Pitts was also a regular attendant at Nicolas Rashevsky’s seminars in theoretical biology, which included Frank Offner, Herbert Landahl, Alston Householder, and the neuroanatomist Gerhardt von Bonin from the University of Illinois at Chicago. In 1940, Von Bonin introduced Lettvin to Warren McCulloch, who would become a professor of psychiatry at Illinois.

In 1941 Warren McCulloch took a position as professor of psychiatry at the University of Illinois at Chicago, and in early 1942 he invited Pitts, who was still homeless, together with Lettvin to live with his family. In the evenings, McCulloch and Pitts collaborated. Pitts was familiar with the work of Gottfried Leibniz on computing and they considered the question of whether the nervous system could be considered a kind of universal computing device as described by Leibniz. This led to their seminal neural networks paper "A Logical Calculus of Ideas Immanent in Nervous Activity". After five years of unofficial studies, the University of Chicago awarded Pitts an Associate of Arts (his only earned degree) for his work on the paper.

In 1943, Lettvin introduced Pitts to Norbert Wiener at the Massachusetts Institute of Technology. Their first meeting, where they discussed Wiener's proof of the ergodic theorem, went so well that Pitts moved to Greater Boston to work with Wiener. While Pitts was an unofficial student under the aegis of Wiener at MIT until their acrimonious parting in 1952, he formally enrolled as a graduate student in the physics department during the 1943–1944 academic year and in the electrical engineering department from 1956 to 1958.

In 1944, Pitts was hired by Kellex Corporation (later acquired in 1950 by Vitro Corporation) in New York City, part of the Atomic Energy Project.

From 1946, Pitts was a core member of the Macy conferences, whose principal purpose was to set the foundations for a general science of the workings of the human mind.

== Personal life and death ==
In 1951, Wiener convinced Jerome Wiesner to hire some physiologists of the nervous system. A group was established with Pitts, Lettvin, McCulloch, and Pat Wall. Pitts wrote a large dissertation on the properties of neural nets connected in three dimensions. Lettvin described him as "in no uncertain sense the genius of the group ... when you asked him a question, you would get back a whole textbook." Pitts never married. Pitts was also described as an eccentric, refusing to allow his name to be made publicly available. He continued to refuse all offers of advanced degrees or positions of authority at MIT, in part as he would have to sign his name.

In 1952, Wiener suddenly turned against McCulloch—his wife, Margaret Wiener, hated McCulloch—and broke off relations with anyone connected to him, including Pitts.

Although he remained employed as a research associate in the Research Laboratory of Electronics at MIT "as little more than a technicality" for the rest of his life, Pitts became increasingly socially isolated. In 1959, the paradigmatic "What the Frog’s Eye Tells the Frog’s Brain" (credited to Humberto Maturana, Lettvin, McCulloch and Pitts) conclusively demonstrated that "analog processes in the eye were doing at least part of the interpretive work" in image processing as opposed to "the brain computing information digital neuron by digital neuron using the exacting implement of mathematical logic", leading Pitts to burn his unpublished doctoral dissertation on probabilistic three-dimensional neural networks and years of unpublished research. He took little further interest in work, accepting only a collaboration with Lettvin and Robert Gesteland which produced a paper on olfaction in 1965.

Pitts died in 1969 of bleeding esophageal varices, a condition usually associated with cirrhosis and alcoholism.

== Publications ==
- Walter Pitts, "Some observations on the simple neuron circuit", Bulletin of Mathematical Biology, Volume 4, Number 3, 121–129, 1942.
- Warren McCulloch and Walter Pitts, "A Logical Calculus of Ideas Immanent in Nervous Activity", 1943, Bulletin of Mathematical Biophysics 5:115–133. Reprinted in Neurocomputing: Foundations of Research. Edited by James A. Anderson and Edward Rosenfeld. MIT Press, 1988. pages 15–27
- Warren McCulloch and Walter Pitts, "On how we know universals: The perception of auditory and visual forms", 1947, Bulletin of Mathematical Biophysics 9:127–147.
- R. Howland, Jerome Lettvin, Warren McCulloch, Walter Pitts, and P. D. Wall, "Reflex inhibition by dorsal root interaction", 1955, Journal of Neurophysiology 18:1–17.
- P. D. Wall, Warren McCulloch, Jerome Lettvin and Walter Pitts, "Effects of strychnine with special reference to spinal afferent fibres", 1955, Epilepsia Series 3, 4:29–40.
- Jerome Lettvin, Humberto Maturana, Warren McCulloch, and Walter Pitts, "What the Frog's Eye Tells the Frog's Brain", 1959, Proceedings of the Institute of Radio Engineers 47: 1940–1951.
- Humberto Maturana, Jerome Lettvin, Warren McCulloch, and Walter Pitts, "Anatomy and physiology of vision in the frog", 1960, Journal of General Physiology, 43:129—175.
- Robert Gesteland, Jerome Lettvin and Walter Pitts, "Chemical Transmission in the Nose of the Frog", 1965, J.Physiol. 181, 525–529.
