= Neural network =

Structure in biology and artificial intelligence

A neural network is a group of interconnected units called neurons that send signals to one another. Neurons can be either biological cells or mathematical models. While individual neurons are simple, many of them together in a network can perform complex tasks. There are two main types of neural networks.

- In neuroscience, a biological neural network is a physical structure found in brains and complex nervous systems – a population of nerve cells connected by synapses.
- In machine learning, an artificial neural network is a mathematical model used to approximate nonlinear functions. Artificial neural networks are used to solve artificial intelligence problems.

In neuroscience, behavior and cognition arise from interactions between distributed brain regions. In computer science, artificial neural networks power many modern AI systems, but require large datasets and substantial computing power. Additionally, their internal representations are difficult to interpret.

== In biology ==
Animated confocal micrograph of part of a biological neural network in a mouse's striatum

In the context of biology, a neural network is a population of biological neurons chemically connected to each other by synapses. A given neuron can be connected to hundreds of thousands of synapses. Each neuron sends and receives electrochemical signals called action potentials to its connected neighbors. A neuron can serve an excitatory role, amplifying and propagating signals it receives, or an inhibitory role, suppressing signals instead.

Populations of interconnected neurons that are smaller than neural networks are called neural circuits. Very large interconnected networks are called large scale brain networks, and many of these together form brains and nervous systems.

Signals generated by neural networks in the brain eventually travel through the nervous system and across neuromuscular junctions to muscle cells, where they cause contraction and thereby motion.

== In machine learning ==
Schematic of a simple feedforward artificial neural network

In machine learning, a neural network is an artificial mathematical model used to approximate nonlinear functions. While early artificial neural networks were physical machines, today they are almost always implemented in software.

Neurons in an artificial neural network are usually arranged into layers, with information passing from the first layer (the input layer) through one or more intermediate layers (the hidden layers) to the final layer (the output layer). The "signal" input to each neuron is a number, specifically a linear combination of the outputs of the connected neurons in the previous layer. The signal each neuron outputs is calculated from this number, according to its activation function. The behavior of the network depends on the strengths (or weights) of the connections between neurons. A network is trained by modifying these weights through empirical risk minimization or backpropagation in order to fit some preexisting dataset.

The term deep neural network refers to neural networks that have more than three layers, typically including at least two hidden layers in addition to the input and output layers.

Because their internal representations are difficult to analyze, artificial neural networks are often described as "black box" models, and interpretability is an active domain of research, especially for high-stakes applications.

Neural networks are used to solve problems in artificial intelligence, and have thereby found applications in many disciplines, including predictive modeling, adaptive control, facial recognition, handwriting recognition, general game playing, and generative AI.

== History ==
The theoretical base for contemporary neural networks was independently proposed by Alexander Bain in 1873 and William James in 1890. Both posited that human thought emerged from interactions among large numbers of neurons inside the brain. In 1949, Donald Hebb described Hebbian learning, the idea that neural networks can change and learn over time by strengthening a synapse every time a signal travels along it. In 1956, Svaetichin discovered the functioning of second order retinal cells (Horizontal Cells), which were fundamental for the understanding of neural networks.

Artificial neural networks were originally used to model biological neural networks starting in the 1930s under the approach of connectionism. However, starting with the mathematical model of artificial neurons proposed by Warren McCulloch and Walter Pitts in 1943, followed by Frank Rosenblatt's introduction of the perceptron, and its hardware implementation in the late 1950s artificial neural networks became increasingly used for machine learning applications instead, and increasingly differed from their biological counterparts.

In 1969, Marvin Minsky and Seymour Papert analyzed the limitations of single-layer perceptrons in their book Perceptrons, and this critique led to a decline in funding and interest in neural-network research that some authors describe as an "AI winter".

Research on neural networks revived in the 1980s with the development and popularization of multilayer networks trained by back-propagation, and from the 2000s onward the combination of large datasets, faster hardware (notably GPUs), and algorithmic advances that have led to the rise of deep learning.

== See also ==
- Emergence
- Biological cybernetics
- Biologically-inspired computing
