= Seppo Linnainmaa =

Finnish mathematician and computer scientist

- Born: Seppo Ilmari Linnainmaa; September 28, 1945 (age 80); Pori, Finland
- Education: University of Helsinki (MSc, PhD)
- Known for: Backpropagation; Reverse mode of automatic differentiation
- Scientific career
- Fields: Mathematics, computer science
- Workplaces: University of Helsinki; University of Maryland; VTT Technical Research Centre of Finland
- Thesis: (1974)

Seppo Ilmari Linnainmaa (born 28 September 1945) is a Finnish mathematician and computer scientist known for creating the modern version of backpropagation.

== Biography ==
He was born in Pori. He received his MSc in 1970 and introduced a reverse mode of automatic differentiation in his MSc thesis. In 1974 he obtained the first doctorate ever awarded in computer science at the University of Helsinki. In 1976, he became Assistant Professor. From 1984 to 1985 he was Visiting Professor at the University of Maryland, USA. From 1986 to 1989 he was Chairman of the Finnish Artificial Intelligence Society. From 1989 to 2007, he was Research Professor at the VTT Technical Research Centre of Finland. He retired in 2007.

== Backpropagation ==
Explicit, efficient error backpropagation in arbitrary, discrete, possibly sparsely connected, neural networks-like networks was first described in Linnainmaa's 1970 master's thesis, albeit without reference to NNs, when he introduced the reverse mode of automatic differentiation (AD), in order to efficiently compute the derivative of a differentiable composite function that can be represented as a graph, by recursively applying the chain rule to the building blocks of the function. Linnainmaa published it first, following Gerardi Ostrowski who had used it in the context of certain process models in chemical engineering some five years earlier, but didn't publish.
