= Decoupling (probability) =

In probability and statistics, decoupling is a reduction of a sample statistic to an average of the statistic evaluated on several independent sequences of the random variable. This sum, conditioned on all but one of the independent sequences, becomes a sum of independent random variables. Decoupling is used in the study of U statistics, where decoupling should not be confused with Hoeffding's decomposition, however. (Such "decoupling" is unrelated to the use of "couplings" in the study of stochastic processes.)
