= Plateau (mathematics) =

A plateau of a function is a part of its domain where the function has a constant value.

More formally, let U, V be topological spaces. A plateau for a function f: U → V is a path-connected set of points P of U such that for some y we have

f (p) = y

for all p in P.

== Examples ==
Plateaus can be observed in mathematical models as well as natural systems. In nature, plateaus can be observed in physical, chemical and biological systems. An example of an observed plateau in the natural world is in the tabulation of biodiversity of life through time.

== See also ==
- Level set
- Contour line
- Minimal surface
