= Softplus =

Smoothed ramp function

Plot of the softplus function and the ramp function

In mathematics and machine learning, the softplus function is

$$f(x) = \ln(1 + e^x).$$

It is a smooth approximation (in fact, an analytic function) to the ramp function, which is known as the rectifier or ReLU (rectified linear unit) in machine learning. For large negative $x$ it is $\ln(1 + e^x) = \ln (1 + \epsilon) \gtrapprox \ln 1 = 0$, so just above 0, while for large positive $x$ it is $\ln(1 + e^x) \gtrapprox \ln(e^x) = x$, so just above $x$.

The names softplus and SmoothReLU are used in machine learning. The name "softplus" (2000), by analogy with the earlier softmax (1989) is presumably because it is a smooth (soft) approximation of the positive part of x, which is sometimes denoted with a superscript plus, $x^+ := \max(0, x)$.

== Alternative forms ==
This function can be approximated as:

$$\ln\left( 1 + e^x \right) \approx \begin{cases} \ln2, & x=0,\\[6pt] \frac x {1-e^{-x/\ln2}}, & x\neq 0 \end{cases}$$

By making the change of variables $x = y\ln(2)$, this is equivalent to

$$\log_2(1 + 2^y) \approx \begin{cases} 1,& y=0,\\[6pt] \frac{y}{1-e^{-y}}, & y\neq 0. \end{cases}$$

A sharpness parameter $k$ may be included:

$$f(x) = \frac{\ln(1 + e^{kx})} k, \qquad\qquad
f'(x) = \frac{e^{kx}}{1 + e^{kx}} = \frac{1}{1 + e^{-kx}}.$$

Additionally, the softplus function is equivalent to the log of the sigmoid function in the following way:

$-\ln(\text{sigmoid}(-x)) = -\ln\left(\frac{1}{1+e^x}\right) = \ln\left(1+e^x\right) = \text{softplus}(x)$

== Related functions ==
The derivative of softplus is the standard logistic function:

$$f'(x) = \frac{e^{x}}{1 + e^{x}} = \frac{1}{1 + e^{-x}}$$

The logistic function or the sigmoid function is a smooth approximation of the rectifier, the Heaviside step function.

=== LogSumExp ===
The multivariable generalization of single-variable softplus is the LogSumExp with the first argument set to zero:

$$\operatorname{LSE_0}^+(x_1, \dots, x_n) := \operatorname{LSE}(0, x_1, \dots, x_n) = \ln(1 + e^{x_1} + \cdots + e^{x_n}).$$

The LogSumExp function is

$$\operatorname{LSE}(x_1, \dots, x_n) = \ln(e^{x_1} + \cdots + e^{x_n}),$$

and its gradient is the softmax; the softmax with the first argument set to zero is the multivariable generalization of the logistic function. Both LogSumExp and softmax are used in machine learning.

=== Convex conjugate ===
The convex conjugate (specifically, the Legendre transformation) of the softplus function is the negative binary entropy function (with base e). This is because (following the definition of the Legendre transformation: the derivatives are inverse functions) the derivative of softplus is the logistic function, whose inverse function is the logit, which is the derivative of negative binary entropy.

Softplus can be interpreted as logistic loss (as a positive number), so, by duality, minimizing logistic loss corresponds to maximizing entropy. This justifies the principle of maximum entropy as loss minimization.
