= Dileep George =

Indian scientist (born 1977)

- Education: Stanford University
- Occupation: Neuroscientist
- Scientific career
- Workplaces: Redwood Neuroscience Institute; Numenta; Vicarious
- Thesis: How the brain might work: A hierarchical and temporal model for learning and recognition (2008)
- Doctoral advisor: Bernard Widrow

Dileep George is an artificial intelligence and neuroscience researcher.

== Career ==
George received his PhD in Electrical Engineering from Stanford University in 2006 and was a visiting fellow at the Redwood Center for Theoretical Neuroscience at the University of California, Berkeley.

In 2005, George pioneered hierarchical temporal memory and cofounded the AI research startup Numenta, Inc. with Jeff Hawkins and Donna Dubinsky. In 2010, George left Numenta to join D. Scott Phoenix in founding Vicarious, an AI research project funded by internet billionaires Peter Thiel and Dustin Moskovitz.

The Alphabet-owned company Intrinsic acquired Vicarious in 2022. The AI and robotics divisions merged with Intrinsic, while the research division (including George) joined DeepMind. As of 2022, George is a Research Scientist at DeepMind.
