= Predictive learning =

Machine learning technique

Predictive learning is a machine learning (ML) technique where an artificial intelligence model is fed new data to develop an understanding of its environment, capabilities, and limitations. This technique finds application in many areas, including neuroscience, business, robotics, and computer vision. This concept was developed and expanded by French computer scientist Yann LeCun in 1988 during his career at Bell Labs, where he trained models to detect handwriting so that financial companies could automate check processing.

The mathematical foundation for predictive learning dates back to the 17th century, where British insurance company Lloyd's used predictive analytics to make a profit. Starting out as a mathematical concept, this method expanded the possibilities of artificial intelligence. Predictive learning is an attempt to learn with a minimum of pre-existing mental structure. It was inspired by Jean Piaget's account of children constructing knowledge of the world through interaction. Gary Drescher's book Made-up Minds was crucial to the development of this concept.

The idea that predictions and unconscious inference are used by the brain to construct a model of the world, in which it can identify causes of percepts, goes back even further to Hermann von Helmholtz's iteration of this study. These ideas were further developed by the field of predictive coding. Another related predictive learning theory is Jeff Hawkins' memory-prediction framework, which is laid out in his book On Intelligence.

== Mathematical procedures ==
=== Training process ===
Similar to ML, predictive learning aims to extrapolate the value of an unknown dependent variable $Y$, given independent input data $X=(x_1, x_2,\dots, x_n)$. A set of attributes can be classified into categorical data (discrete factors such as race, sex, or affiliation) or numerical data (continuous values such as temperature, annual income, or speed). Every set of input values is fed into a neural network to predict a value $y$. In order to predict the output accurately, the weights of the neural network (which represent how much each predictor variable affects the outcome) must be incrementally adjusted via backpropagation to produce estimates closer to the actual data.

Once an ML model is given enough adjustments through training to predict values closer to the ground truth, it should be able to correctly predict outputs of new data with little error.

=== Maximizing accuracy ===
In order to ensure maximum accuracy for a predictive learning model, the predicted values $\hat{y}=F(x)$ must not exceed a certain error threshold when compared to actual values $y$ by the risk formula:

$R(F) = E_{xy}L(y, F(x))$,

where $L$ is the loss function, $y$ is the ground truth, and $F(x)$ is the predicted data. This error function is used to make incremental adjustments to the model's weights to eventually reach a well-trained prediction of:

$F^{*}(x) = \underset{F(x)}{\operatorname{argmin}}\, E_{xy}$$L(y,F(x))$

Once the error is negligible or considered small enough after training, the model is said to have converged.

=== Ensemble learning ===
In some cases, using a singular machine learning approach is not enough to create an accurate estimate for certain data. Ensemble learning is the combination of several ML algorithms to create a stronger model. Each model is represented by the function

$F(x)=a_0 + \sum_{m=1}^M a_m f_m(x)$,

where $M$ is the number of ensemble models, $a_0$ is the bias, $a_m$ is the weight corresponding to each $m$-th variable, and $f_m(x)$ is the activation function corresponding to each variable. An ensemble learning model is represented as a linear combination of the predictions from each constituent approach,

$\hat{a}_m = \underset{a_m}{\operatorname{argmin}} \sum_{i=1}^N L\left(y_i, a_0 + \sum_{m=1}^M a_m f_m(x_i)\right) + \lambda \sum_{m=1}^M |a_m|$

where $y_i$ is the actual value, the second parameter is the value predicted by each constituent method, and $\lambda$ is a coefficient representing each model's variation for a certain predictor variable.

== Applications ==
=== Cognitive development ===
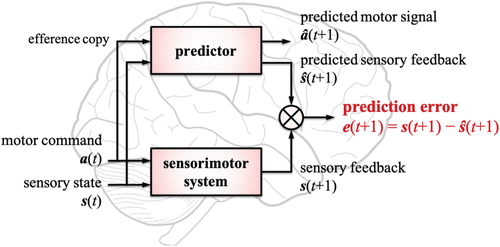
Dr. Yukie Nagai's predictive learning architecture for predicting sensorimotor signals

Sensorimotor signals are neural impulses sent to the brain upon physical touch. Using predictive learning to detect sensorimotor signals plays a key role in early cognitive development, as the human brain represents sensorimotor signals in a predictive manner (it attempts to minimize prediction error between incoming sensory signals and top–down prediction). In order to update an unadjusted predictor, it must be trained through sensorimotor experiences because it does not inherently have prediction ability. In a recent research paper, Dr. Yukie Nagai suggested a new architecture in predictive learning to predict sensorimotor signals based on a two-module approach: a sensorimotor system which interacts with the environment and a predictor which simulates the sensorimotor system in the brain.

=== Language modelling and representation learning ===
Predictive learning is applied to language modelling by training neural networks to predict the next word from preceding context. This training can also produce distributed word representations that help models generalise to word sequences not encountered during training.

Another application is the computational modelling of language learning, where word-prediction tasks are used to investigate how linguistic structure can be acquired without explicit grammatical labels. The resulting internal representations can reflect grammatical and semantic categories, as well as context-dependent syntactic roles. For example, a cerebellum-inspired recurrent network trained on next-word prediction developed representations from which subject, verb and object roles could be decoded.

=== Spatiotemporal memory ===
Computers use predictive learning in spatiotemporal memory to completely create an image given constituent frames. This implementation uses predictive recurrent neural networks, which are neural networks designed to work with sequential data, such as a time series. Using predictive learning in conjunction with computer vision enables computers to create images of their own, which can be helpful when replicating sequential phenomena such as replicating DNA strands, face recognition, or even creating X-ray images.

=== Social media consumer behavior ===
In a recent study, data on consumer behavior was collected from various social media platforms such as Facebook, Twitter, LinkedIn, YouTube, Instagram, and Pinterest. The usage of predictive learning analytics led researchers to discover various trends in consumer behavior, such as determining how successful a campaign could be, estimating a fair price for a product to attract consumers, assessing how secure data is, and analyzing the specific audience of the consumers they could target for specific products.

== See also ==
- Reinforcement learning
- Predictive coding
