= Vicarious (company) =

Artificial intelligence company

- Type: Privately held
- Industry: Artificial intelligence
- Founded: 2010; 16 years ago
- Founders: D. Scott Phoenix; Dileep George
- Headquarters: San Francisco Bay Area, California, U.S.
- Parent: Intrinsic (Alphabet Inc.)
- Website: vicarious.com

Vicarious was an artificial intelligence company based in the San Francisco Bay Area, California. It uses the theorized computational principles of the brain to attempt to build software that can think and learn like a human. Vicarious describes its technology as "a turnkey robotics solution integrator using artificial intelligence to automate tasks too complex and versatile for traditional automations". Alphabet Inc acquired the company in 2022 for an undisclosed amount.

== Founders ==
The company was founded in 2010 by D. Scott Phoenix and Dileep George. Before co-founding Vicarious, Phoenix was Entrepreneur in Residence at Founders Fund and CEO of Frogmetrics, a touchscreen analytics company he co-founded through the Y Combinator incubator program. Previously, George was Chief Technology Officer at Numenta, a company he co-founded with Jeff Hawkins and Donna Dubinsky while completing his PhD at Stanford University.

== Funding ==
The company launched in February 2011 with funding from Founders Fund, Dustin Moskovitz, Adam D’Angelo (former Facebook CTO and co-founder of Quora), Felicis Ventures, and Palantir co-founder Joe Lonsdale. In August 2012, in its Series A round of funding, it raised an additional $15 million. The round was led by Good Ventures; Founders Fund, Open Field Capital and Zarco Investment Group also participated.

The company received $40 million in its Series B round of funding. The round was led by individuals including Mark Zuckerberg, Elon Musk, and others. An additional undisclosed amount was later contributed by Amazon.com CEO Jeff Bezos, Yahoo! co-founder Jerry Yang, Skype co-founder Janus Friis and Salesforce.com CEO Marc Benioff.

== Recursive Cortical Network ==
Vicarious is developing machine learning software based on the computational principles of the human brain. One such software is a vision system known as the Recursive Cortical Network (RCN), it is a generative graphical visual perception system that interprets the contents of photographs and videos in a manner similar to humans. On October 22, 2013, beating CAPTCHA, Vicarious announced its model was reliably able to solve modern CAPTCHAs, with character recognition rates of 90% or better when trained on one style. However, Luis von Ahn, a pioneer of early CAPTCHA and founder of reCAPTCHA, expressed skepticism, stating: "It's hard for me to be impressed since I see these every few months." He pointed out that 50 claims similar to that of Vicarious had been made since 2003. Vicarious later published their findings in the peer-reviewed journal Science.

Vicarious has indicated that its AI was not specifically designed to complete CAPTCHAs and its success at the task is a product of its advanced vision system. Because Vicarious's algorithms are based on insights from the human brain, it is also able to recognize photographs, videos, and other visual data.

== See also ==
- Artificial intelligence
- Glossary of artificial intelligence
