= Donna Dubinsky =

American business leader

- Born: 1955 (age 70–71); Cleveland, Ohio, U.S.
- Education: Yale University; Harvard Business School
- Occupation: Businessperson
- Known for: CEO of Palm, co-founder of Handspring and Numenta
- Spouse: Len Shustek

Donna Dubinsky is an American businesswoman who played a role in the development of personal digital assistants (PDAs), as CEO of Palm, Inc. and co-founding Handspring with Jeff Hawkins in 1995. Dubinsky co-founded Numenta in 2005 with Hawkins and Dileep George, based in Redwood City, CA. Numenta was founded to develop machine intelligence based on the principles of the neocortex. Dubinsky was the board chair of Numenta from 2005 to 2024. Dubinsky is on the board of Twilio (NYSE: TWLO) and was on the board of Yale University from 2006 to 2018, including two years as senior trustee.

Fortune nominated her, together with Hawkins, to the Innovators Hall of Fame, while Time named the pair as part of its Digital 50 in 1999, for their contribution to the development of the PDA.

== Early years ==
Born in Cleveland, Dubinsky grew up in Benton Harbor, Michigan, where her father, Alfred Dubinsky, worked as a scrap-metal broker. Her grandfather was a Russian immigrant. While attending high school, Dubinsky worked as a sales clerk at a embroidery store, a job that started her interest in business. She later attended Yale University where, as a student in Jonathan Edwards College, she majored in history and earned her bachelor's degree in 1977. Dubinsky then worked for the Philadelphia National Bank before obtaining an MBA from Harvard Business School in 1981. At one Harvard Business School class, Dubinsky saw a demonstration on an Apple II of VisiCalc, an early computer spreadsheet program. That demonstration inspired Dubinsky to apply for a job at Apple Computer.

After graduating from Harvard Business School, she worked as a customer-support liaison at Apple. By 1985, she managed multiple divisions in Apple, including customer service and product distribution.

In 1986]7, Bill Campbell recruited her to a senior position in Claris, a software subsidiary of Apple. Dubinsky was responsible for international sales and marketing, and within four years, her group was responsible for 50% of Claris's sales. However, Dubinsky decided to leave in 1991, when Apple did not allow Claris to become an independent company.

== Palm, Inc. and Handspring ==
After a year's sabbatical in Paris to study French, Dubinsky met Jeff Hawkins through the introductions of Bill Campbell and Bruce Dunlevie. Hawkins was looking for a CEO to manage Palm, Inc. Dubinsky and Hawkins cofounded Palm in 1992.

In 1995, USRobotics acquired Palm, Inc. for US$44 million. The first PalmPilot went on sale in April 1996. After a few months, sales started ramping quickly. In its first 18 months, more than one million PalmPilots had been sold. 3Com acquired USRobotics, with its Palm subsidiary, in 1997.

Dubinsky, Hawkins, and Palm marketing manager Ed Colligan quickly became disillusioned with 3Com's plans for Palm, Inc. and left in June 1998 to found Handspring. Handspring became a leader in the market of smartphones with the Treo. The bursting of the dot-com bubble took its toll and Dubinsky lost her place on the Forbes 400 Richest Americans list in 2001. Furthermore, in 2003, Handspring merged with Palm, Inc. The company, formed through the merger was named palmOne. In 2005, palmOne was renamed to Palm, Inc., returning to its roots, and the independent PalmSource was acquired by Access Corporation of Japan.

== Numenta ==
In March 2005, Donna Dubinsky, Jeff Hawkins and Dileep George, founded Numenta, Inc. The company is based in Redwood City, California. Their goal is to create machine intelligence by developing theory based on the principles in the neocortex.

Numenta focuses on large-scale brain theory and simulation. Numenta researchers work with experimentalists and published results to derive an understanding of the neocortex. Their main research focus areas are cortical columns, sequence learning and sparse distributed representations. They have written a number of peer-reviewed journal papers and research reports on these topics.

In 2024, the company announced its open-source initiative, the Thousand Brains Project, aimed at developing a new AI framework that will operate on the same principles as the human brain.

== Harvard Alumni Achievement Award ==
On September 27, 2007, Donna Dubinsky was conferred the Harvard Business School's highest honor, the Alumni Achievement Award, by Dean Jay O. Light. The award was also given to: Ayala Corp. chair Jaime Augusto Zobel de Ayala, A. Malachi Mixon of Invacare, Sir Martin Sorrell of WPP Group and Hansjörg Wyss of Synthes. Dubinsky was cited for "introducing the first successful personal digital assistant (PDA) and who is now developing a computer memory system modeled after the human brain."

== Other activities ==
Dubinsky was a trustee of the Computer History Museum in Mountain View, California. Several business school case studies have been written about her entrepreneurship. She is involved in philanthropy, and has written an op-ed in support of Obamacare.

In 2022, Dubinsky joined the United States Department of Commerce at the request of Secretary of Commerce, Gina Raimondo, to be the first person focused on implementing the CHIPS and Science Act, which was passed into law about three months after she joined. Dubinsky then turned her attention to help create the National Semiconductor Technology Center (NSTC) enabled through the legislation. In late 2023, Dubinsky left the Department of Commerce to become a trustee of Natcast, the purpose-built, non-profit entity created to operate the NSTC.
