= Pentti Kanerva =

American neuroscientist

Pentti Kanerva (born 1937) is a Finnish-born American neuroscientist and the originator of the sparse distributed memory model. He is responsible for relating the properties of long-term memory to mathematical properties of high-dimensional spaces and compares artificial neural-net associative memory to conventional computer random-access memory and to the neurons in the brain. This theory has been applied to design and implement the random indexing approach to learning semantic relations from linguistic data. Kanerva was also the first to use a computer clipboard to preserve deleted texts. The operation would later come to be known as cut, copy, and paste.

== Education and career ==
Kanerva started his career studying forestry in Finland. He moved to the United States and received an A.A. from Warren Wilson College (1956). He returned to Finland and completed an M.S. in forestry, with a minor in mathematics and statistics from the University of Helsinki, Finland (1964). Kanerva worked in statistics and programming for the Finnish Forest Research Institute, the Finnish State Computer Center, and the University of Tampere, Finland, before emigrating to the United States in 1967. He worked for Stanford University as a systems specialist and research assistant before earning his Ph.D. there in 1984. Kanerva went on to work at NASA's Ames Research Center and the Swedish Institute of Computer Science, before taking a position at the Redwood Neuroscience Institute of the University of California, Berkeley.

Kanerva is a member of the Cognitive Science Society, the International Neural Network Society, and the European Academy of Sciences.
