= D. Scott Phoenix =

American businessman (born 1982)

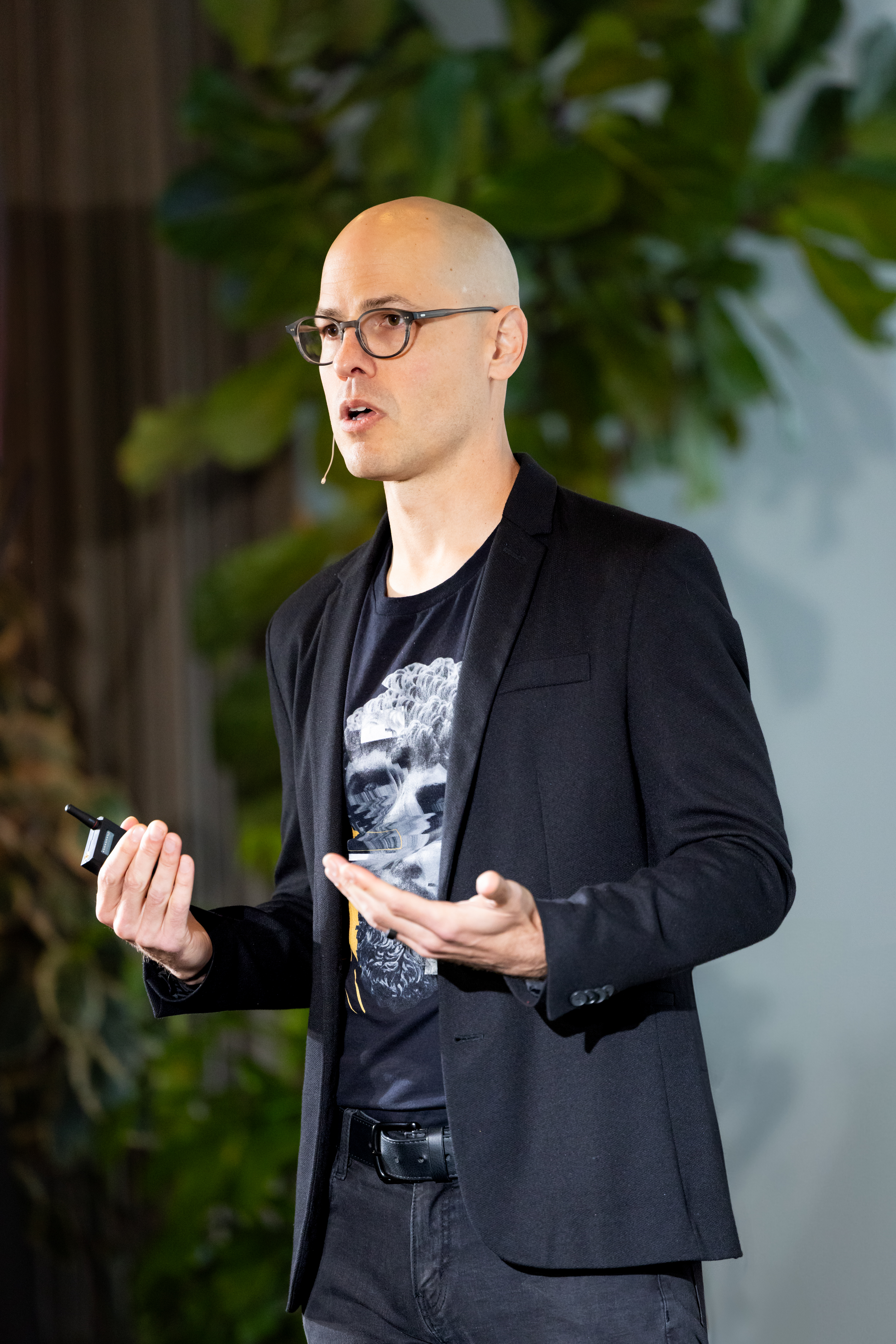
- D. Scott Phoenix at Fifty Years Progress Valley event
- Born: June 10, 1982 (age 44)
- Education: University of Pennsylvania

D. Scott Phoenix is an American entrepreneur and former cofounder and CEO of Vicarious, an artificial intelligence research company funded by $250 million from Elon Musk, Mark Zuckerberg, and others that was acquired by Intrinsic, an Alphabet company in 2022.

== Career ==
In 2007, Phoenix graduated from the University of Pennsylvania with a Bachelor of Applied Science in Computer Science and Entrepreneurship. After graduation, Phoenix started a company through the Y Combinator program, and later joined venture capital firm Founders Fund as Entrepreneur in Residence. In 2010, Phoenix co-founded Vicarious with neuroscientist and AI researcher Dileep George. He is an advocate for the development of safe AI, and a leading signatory on the Future of Life Institute's Open Letter on Artificial Intelligence and the Asilomar AI Principles. In 2016, he predicted that by 2031 the fastest computing system would perform more operations per second than the number of neocortical neurons in all human brains alive at the time of the quote (on the order of 10^20 FLOPS, or 100 exaflops). After Vicarious was acquired, Phoenix spent a year as the Chief Product and Revenue Officer of Intrinsic, an Alphabet subsidiary.

Phoenix is interviewed in the 2018 AI documentary Do You Trust This Computer?, on PBS In Principle, and the 2020 AI documentary MACHINE.
