= Cortical minicolumn =

Structure in the brain

A cortical minicolumn (also called cortical microcolumn) is a vertical column through the cortical layers of the brain. Neurons within the microcolumn "receive common inputs, have common outputs, are interconnected, and may well constitute a fundamental computational unit of the cerebral cortex". Minicolumns comprise perhaps 80–120 neurons, except in the primate primary visual cortex (V1), where there are typically more than twice the number. There are about 2×10^{8} minicolumns in humans. From calculations, the diameter of a minicolumn is about 28–40 μm. Minicolumns grow from progenitor cells within the embryo and contain neurons within multiple layers (2–6) of the cortex.

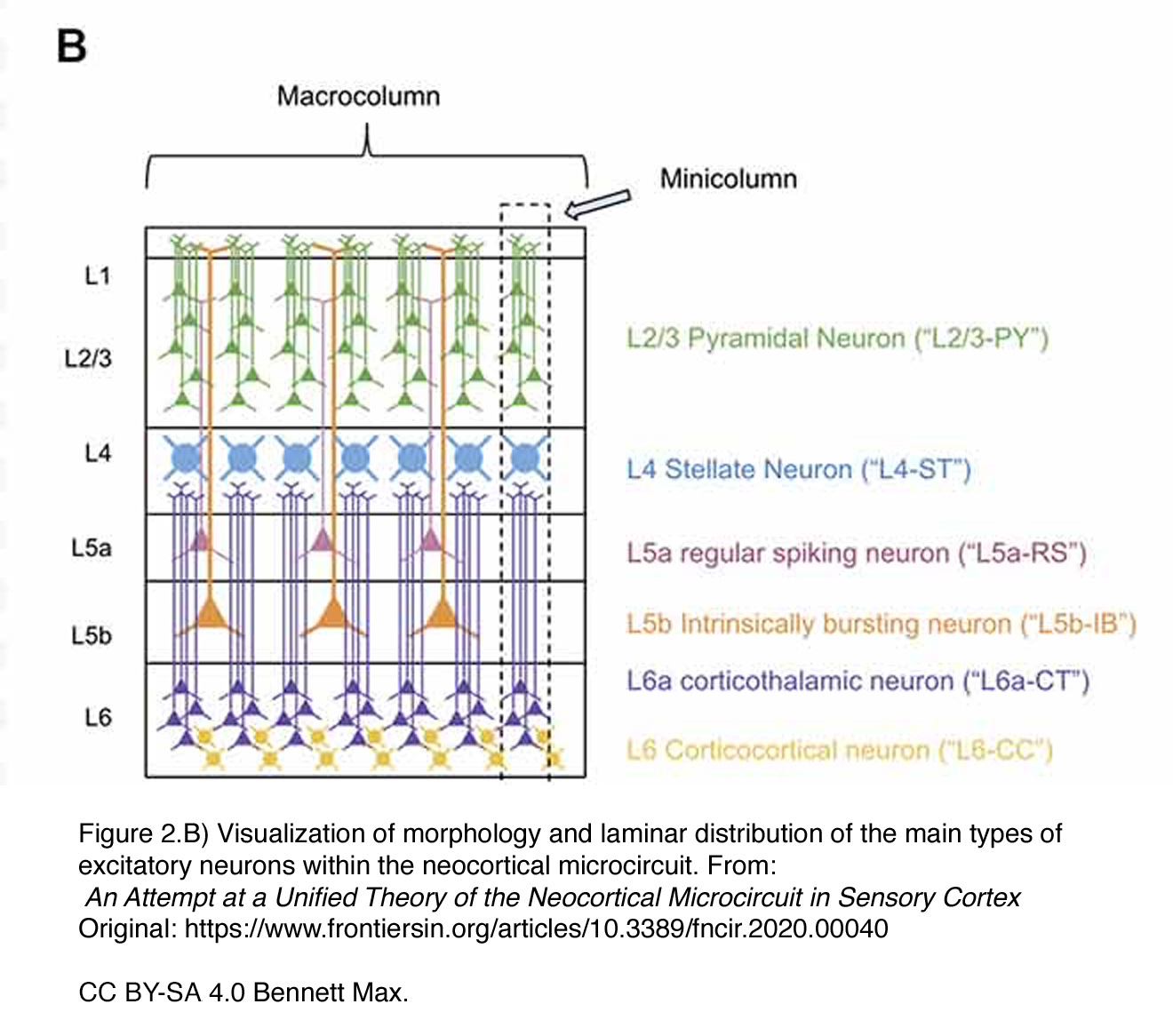
Visualization of cortical minicolumns within a macrocolumn

Many sources support the existence of minicolumns, especially Mountcastle, with strong evidence reviewed by Buxhoeveden and Casanova who conclude "... the minicolumn must be considered a strong model for cortical organization" and "[the minicolumn is] the most basic and consistent template by which the neocortex organizes its neurones, pathways, and intrinsic circuits".

Cells in 50 μm minicolumn all have the same receptive field; adjacent minicolumns may have different fields.

== Number of neurons ==
Estimates of number of neurons in a minicolumn range from 80–100 neurons.

Jones describes a variety of observations that may be interpreted as mini- or micro-columns and gives example numbers from 11 to 142 neurons per minicolumn.

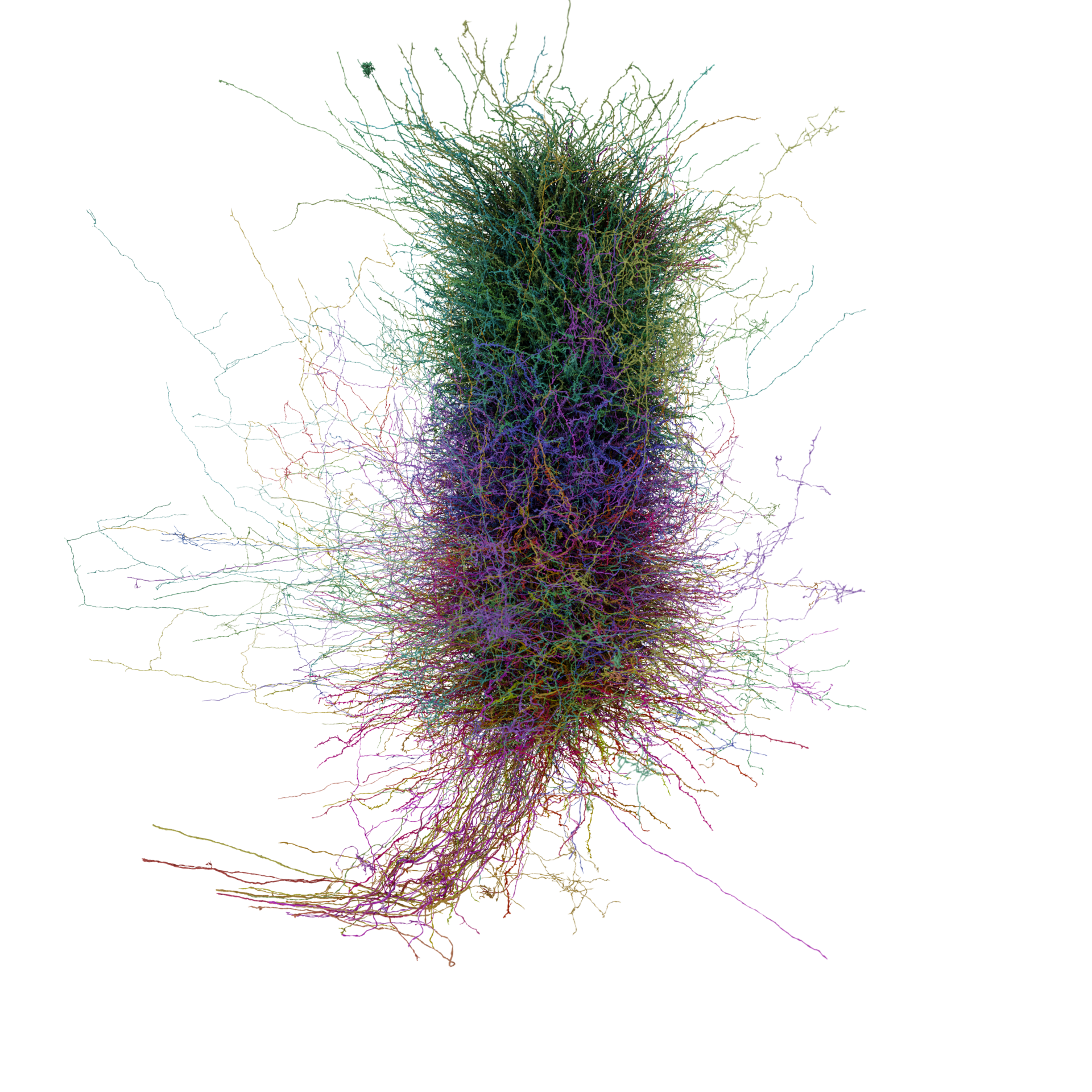
3D render of a cortical minicolumn in the mouse visual cortex

== Number of minicolumns ==
Estimates of the number of neurons in cortex or in neocortex are on the order of 2×10^{10}. Most (perhaps 90%) of cortical neurons are neocortical neurons.

Johansson and Lansner use an estimate of 2×10^{10} neurons in the neocortex and an estimate of 100 neurons per minicolumn, yielding an estimate of 2×10^{8} minicolumns.

Sporns et al. give an estimate of 2×10^{7} – 2×10^{8} minicolumns.

== Size of minicolumns ==
The minicolumn measures of the order of 40–50 μm in transverse diameter; 35–60 μm; 50 μm with 80 μm spacing, or 30 μm with 50 μm. Larger sizes may not be of human minicolumns, for example macaque monkey V1 minicolumns are 31 μm diameter, with 142 pyramidal cells — 1270 columns per mm^{2}. Similarly, the cat V1 has much bigger minicolumns, ~56 μm.

The size can also be calculated from area considerations. If cortex (both hemispheres) is 1.27×10^{11} μm^{2} then if there are 2×10^{8} minicolumns in the neocortex then each is 635 μm^{2}, giving a diameter of 28 μm (if the cortex area were doubled to the commonly quoted value, this would rise to 40 μm). Johansson and Lansner do a similar calculation and arrive at 36 μm (p51, last para).

Downwards projecting axons in minicolumns are ≈10 μm in diameter, periodicity and density similar to those within the cortex, but not necessarily coincident.

== See also ==
- Cortical column
