= Vernon Benjamin Mountcastle =

American physician

Vernon Mountcastle
- Born: Vernon Benjamin Mountcastle; July 15, 1918
- Died: January 11, 2015 (aged 96)
- Education: Roanoke College
- Spouse: Nancy Clayton
- Awards: Karl Spencer Lashley Award (1974); Louisa Gross Horwitz Prize (1978); National Medal of Science (1986)
- Scientific career
- Institutions: Johns Hopkins University

Vernon Benjamin Mountcastle (July 15, 1918 – January 11, 2015) was an American neurophysiologist and Professor Emeritus of Neuroscience at Johns Hopkins University. He discovered and characterized the columnar organization of the cerebral cortex in the 1950s. This discovery was a turning point in investigations of the cerebral cortex, as nearly all cortical studies of sensory function after Mountcastle's 1957 paper, on the somatosensory cortex, used columnar organization as their basis.

== Early life and education ==
Vernon Benjamin Mountcastle was born on July 15, 1918, in Shelbyville, Kentucky as the third of five children into a family of "farmers, industrial entrepreneurs, or builders of railroads". In 1921 his family moved to Roanoke, Virginia where he went to elementary and junior high school and was "an enthusiastic Boy Scout". Because his mother, a former teacher, had taught him to read and write when he was 4 years old, he immediately moved ahead two grades when entering the public school system and graduated from high school at the age of 16. He entered Roanoke College in Salem, Virginia in 1935, in the midst of the Great Depression, where he majored in chemistry and finished in 3 years. While at Roanoke, he played tennis and was a member of the Sigma Chi fraternity. In 1938 he started medical school at Johns Hopkins University where his teachers included William Mansfield Clark, Philip Bard, Adolf Meyer, Arnold Rice Rich, Maxwell Wintrobe, and Warfield Longcope. During his studies, Mountcastle planned to become a surgeon and never performed any experiments until after he returned from World War II. He joined the V-12 Navy College Training Program for medical students in January 1942, which allowed him to finish medical school and internship and was eventually ordered to report to the Naval Operating Base in Norfolk, Virginia in June 1943. Throughout the fall of 1943 and most of 1944 he was stationed in Africa and Europe and served on four LSTs during the Anzio and Normandy invasions. As he had received insufficient points for discharge from the Navy by the end of the war, he had to serve for one more year, which he spent at the Norfolk Naval Hospital as well as briefly serving on the USS Cadmus. He received his discharge from the Navy just before the Cadmus left for extended ocean duty.

== Research and career ==
Mountcastle's interest in cognition, specifically perception, led him to guide his laboratory to studies that linked perception and neural responses in the 1960s. Although there were several notable works from his laboratory, the highest profile early paper appeared in 1968, a study explaining the neural basis of Flutter and vibration by the action of peripheral mechanoreceptors.

In 1978 Mountcastle proposed that all parts of the neocortex operate through a common principle, with the cortical column being the unit of computation.

Mountcastle's devotion to studies of single unit neural coding evolved through his leadership in the Bard Laboratories of Neurophysiology at the Johns Hopkins School of Medicine, which for many years, was the only institute in the world devoted to this sub-field. Its work is continued today in the Zanvyl Krieger Mind/Brain Institute. Mountcastle died in Baltimore at the age of 96 in January 2015.

== Awards and honours ==
Mountcastle was elected to the American Academy of Arts and Sciences in 1965 and National Academy of Sciences in 1966. He became a member of the American Philosophical Society in 1976. In 1978, he was awarded the Louisa Gross Horwitz Prize from Columbia University together with David Hubel and Torsten Wiesel, both of whom received the Nobel Prize in Physiology or Medicine in 1981. In 1980, he was awarded the Ralph W. Gerard Prize in Neuroscience. In 1981, Mountcastle became a founding member of the World Cultural Council. In 1983, he was awarded the Albert Lasker Award for Basic Medical Research. In 1984, Mountcastle received the Golden Plate Award of the American Academy of Achievement. He also received the United States National Medal of Science in 1986. In 1998, Mountcastle was awarded the NAS Award in the Neurosciences from the National Academy of Sciences.

David Hubel in his Nobel Prize acceptance speech said Mountcastle's "discovery of columns in the somatosensory cortex was surely the single most important contribution to the understanding of cerebral cortex since Ramón y Cajal".

Jeff Hawkins in his book On Intelligence describes Mountcastle's 1978 article, An organizing principle..., as "the rosetta stone of neuroscience".
