= Helen Wills Neuroscience Institute =

Scientific institute

Coordinates: 37.874157°N 122.263925°W

The Helen Wills Neuroscience Institute (HWNI) at the University of California, Berkeley was created in 1997 as the Center for Neuroscience. It was renamed in 2000, in recognition of the $10 million bequest from tennis champion and Berkeley alumna Helen Wills, who won 31 Grand Slam titles, including 19 in singles.

== History ==
The Berkeley Neuroscience Center (BNC) was created in 1997 under the leadership of Professors Carla Shatz and Corey Goodman, who served as the first two Directors from 1997–2001. Neuroscience professors in departments across campus were invited to recruit new core faculty and accept graduate students into their labs for training. A $10 million bequest from Olympic gold medalist and 8-time Wimbledon champion Helen Wills Moody endowed the graduate program and provided cash support to grow the Center. On July 1, 2000, it was formally renamed the Helen Wills Neuroscience Institute (HWNI). The Neuroscience PhD Program opened its first class in Fall 2001. At any time there are approximately 60 graduate students in the department.

The institute encompasses over 70 research faculty from many disciplines: Molecular & Cellular Biology, Psychology, Integrative Biology, Vision Science, Chemical Engineering, Electrical Engineering & Computer Science, Physics, and Environmental Science, Policy & Management, Haas School of Business, College of Chemistry, School of Public Health, Department of Bioengineering. The institute supports four general subdivisions within neuroscience: Cellular, Cognitive, Developmental, Molecular, and Systems.

== Research centers ==
The Helen Wills Neuroscience Institute currently houses four research centers each with a unique focus on elucidating the functions of the brain.

=== Brain Imaging Center ===
The Henry H. "Sam" Wheeler Jr. Brain Imaging Center (BIC) headed by Jack Gallant and Chunlei Liu houses one of the most powerful human research functional Magnetic Resonance Imaging (fMRI) systems in the United States. The 3 tesla magnet allows for research collaboration in functional neuroimaging among diverse fields. Data are analyzed at the Judy & John Webb Neuroimaging Computational Facility, also on the Berkeley campus.

=== Redwood Center for Theoretical Neuroscience ===
The Redwood Center for Theoretical Neuroscience became a part of the HWNI on July 1, 2005 after the dissolution of the nonprofit scientific research facility, the Redwood Neuroscience Institute (RNI), once housed in Menlo Park, California. The RNI was established by Jeff Hawkins in August, 2002. Many of the researchers from the RNI joined the University as faculty or staff, and the institute was renamed the Redwood Center for Theoretical Neuroscience. Through the use of various electro- and magnetophysiological techniques, this group hopes to discover an underlying biological mathematics model of memory and cognition.

=== Institute of Cognitive and Brain Sciences ===
The Institute of Cognitive and Brain Sciences (ICBS) became part of the HWNI in September 2009. The ICBS supports research exploring the study of the mind and the biological basis of behavior and mental function. Founded as the Institute for Cognitive Studies in 1984, ICBS adopted its current name in 2000 in recognition of the emergence of cognitive neuroscience as a field for the bi-directional study of mind-brain relationships.

=== Center for Neural Engineering & Prostheses ===
CNEP, led by co-directors Jose Carmena (UCB) and Edward Chang (UCSF) brings together neuroscientists, neurologists, and engineers from UC Berkeley and UCSF to develop breakthrough technologies to restore neural function. CNEP is a non-profit, research-based organization which seeks apply it innovations in common medical practice.

== Directors ==
- 1997–1999: Carla Shatz
- 1999–2001: Corey Goodman
- 2001–2011: Robert T. Knight
- 2011–2013: John Ngai
- 2013–present: Ehud Isacoff
