= Cortical column =

Group of neurons in the cortex of the brain

A cortical column is a group of neurons forming a cylindrical structure through the cerebral cortex of the brain perpendicular to the cortical surface. The structure was first identified by Rafael Lorente de Nó in 1949 while Vernon Benjamin Mountcastle began to disentangle its physiology in 1957. He later identified minicolumns as the basic units of the neocortex which were arranged into columns. Each contains the same types of neurons, connectivity, and firing properties. Columns are also called hypercolumn, macrocolumn, functional column or sometimes cortical module. Neurons within a minicolumn (microcolumn) encode similar features, whereas a hypercolumn "denotes a unit containing a full set of values for any given set of receptive field parameters". A cortical module is defined as either synonymous with a hypercolumn or as a tissue block of multiple overlapping hypercolumns.

Cortical columns are proposed to be the canonical microcircuits for predictive coding, in which the process of cognition is implemented through a hierarchy of identical microcircuits. The evolutionary benefit to this duplication allowed human neocortex to increase in size by almost 3-fold over just the last 3 million years.

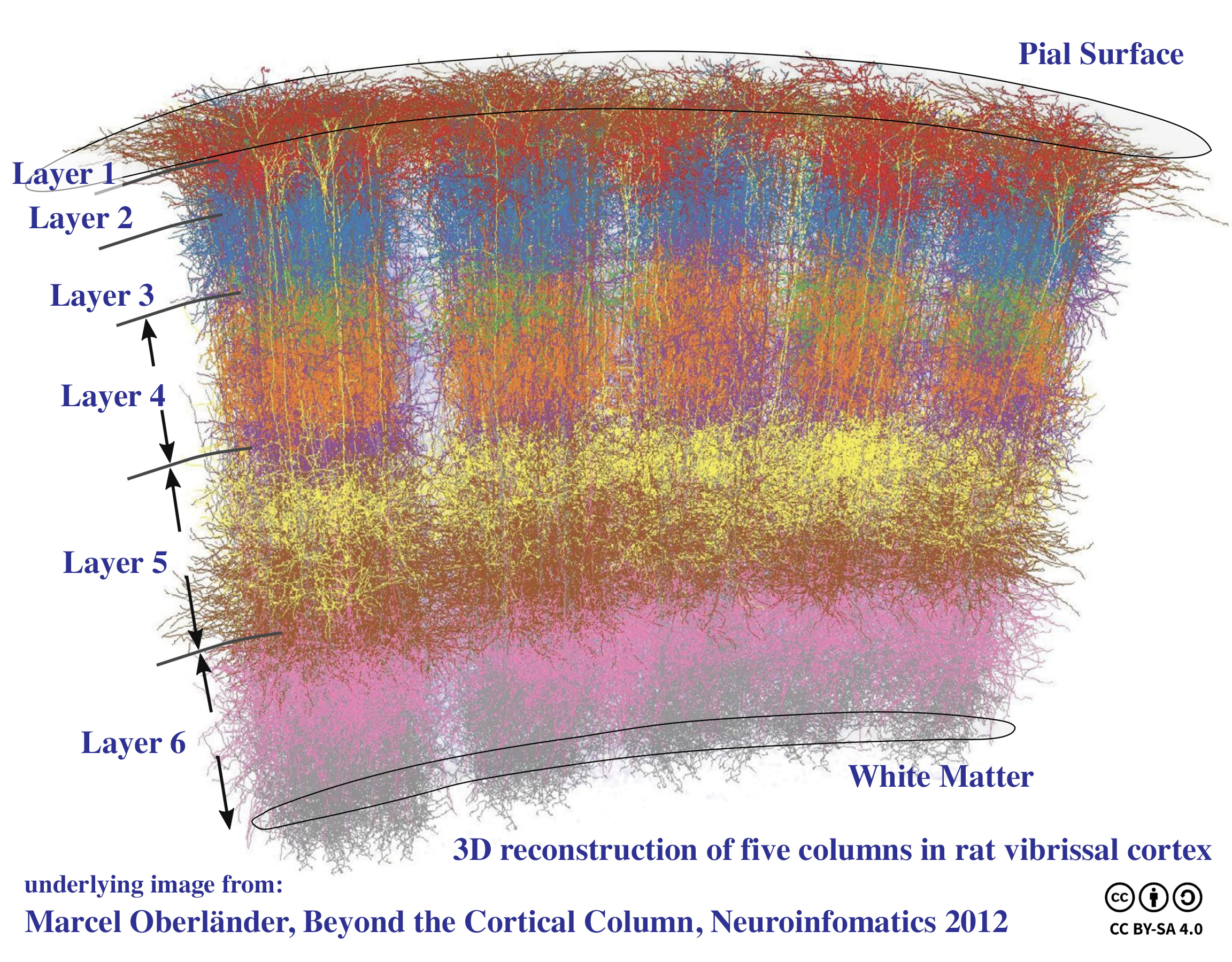
3D reconstruction of five cortical columns in rat vibrissal cortex

The columnar hypothesis states that the cortex is composed of discrete, modular columns of neurons, characterized by a consistent connectivity profile. The columnar organization hypothesis is currently the most widely adopted to explain the cortical processing of information.

== Mammalian cerebral cortex ==
The mammalian cerebral cortex, the grey matter encapsulating the white matter, is composed of layers. The human cortex is between 2 and 3 mm thick. The number of layers is the same in most mammals, but varies throughout the cortex. 6 layers can be recognized in the neocortex, although many regions lack one or more layers. For example, fewer layers are present in the archipallium and the paleopallium.

The 6 layer model of the cerebral cortex defines layers by frequency of cell type. Layer 1 (L1), called the molecular layer, lies in the most superior in the cortex and mainly contains dendrites, axons, and axon terminals. L2 and L3 lie just underneath L1 and both layers contain pyramidal cells, with the size of these cells increasing in the deepest part of L3. L2 and L3 pyramidal axons project to both local and non-local cortical areas. L4, termed the granular layer, is generally responsible for receiving signals from the thalamus, therefore controlling the sensory input of many different cortical areas. L4 is composed of mostly small spherical neurons. L5 is the most inferior layer composed of pyramidal cells. The large pyramidal cells in L5 are responsible for large outputs to subcortical and other cortical areas. L6 is multiform and generally consists of axon projections between structures. Cortical columns are viewed as vertical projections of cells in these layers.

=== Columnar functional organization ===
The columnar functional organization, as originally framed by Vernon Mountcastle, suggests that neurons that are horizontally more than 0.5 mm (500 μm) from each other do not have overlapping sensory receptive fields, and other experiments give similar results: 200–800 μm. Various estimates suggest there are 50 to 100 cortical minicolumns in a hypercolumn, each comprising around 80 neurons. Their role is best understood as 'functional units of information processing.'

An important distinction is that the columnar organization is functional by definition, and reflects the local connectivity of the cerebral cortex. Connections "up" and "down" within the thickness of the cortex are much denser than connections that spread from side to side.

== Hubel and Wiesel studies ==
David Hubel and Torsten Wiesel followed up on Mountcastle's discoveries in the somatic sensory cortex with their own studies in vision. A part of the discoveries that resulted in them winning the 1981 Nobel Prize was that there were cortical columns in vision as well, and that the neighboring columns were also related in function in terms of the orientation of lines that evoked the maximal discharge. Hubel and Wiesel followed up on their own studies with work demonstrating the impact of environmental changes on cortical organization, and the sum total of these works resulted in their Nobel Prize.

=== Visual Studies ===
The visual studies done by Hubel and Wiesel defined ocular dominance (OD) columns. Sometimes referred to as OD stripes, these columns in the visual cortex are groups of neurons that respond to stimulation in either eye. While some columns cannot be defined anatomically because they are so close together, the extensive studies of Hubel and Weisel showed that visual columns can be defined anatomically and physiologically.

== Number of cortical columns ==
There are about 200 million (2×10^{8}) cortical minicolumns in the human neocortex with up to about 110 neurons each, and with estimates of 21–26 billion (2.1×10^{10}–2.6×10^{10}) neurons in the neocortex. With 50 to 100 cortical minicolumns per cortical column a human would have 2–4 million (2×10^{6}–4×10^{6}) cortical columns. There may be more if the columns can overlap, as suggested by Tsunoda et al. Jeff Hawkins claims that there are only 150,000 columns in the human neocortex, based on research made by his company Numenta.

There are claims that minicolumns may have as many as 400 principal cells, but it is not clear if that includes glia cells.

Some contradict the previous estimates, claiming the original research is too arbitrary. The authors propose a uniform neocortex, and choose a fixed width and length to calculate the cell numbers. Later research pointed out that the neocortex is indeed not uniform for other species, and studying nine primate species they found that "the number of neurons underneath 1 mm^{2} of the cerebral cortical surface ... varies by three times across species." The neocortex is not uniform across species. The actual number of neurons within a single column is variable, and depends on the cerebral areas and thus the function of the column.

== See also ==
- Cortical minicolumn
- Ocular dominance column
- Predictive coding
- Radial unit hypothesis
