= Self-attention =

Self-attention can mean:

- Attention (machine learning), a machine learning technique
- self-attention, an attribute of natural cognition
