= Vision transformer =

Machine learning model for vision processing

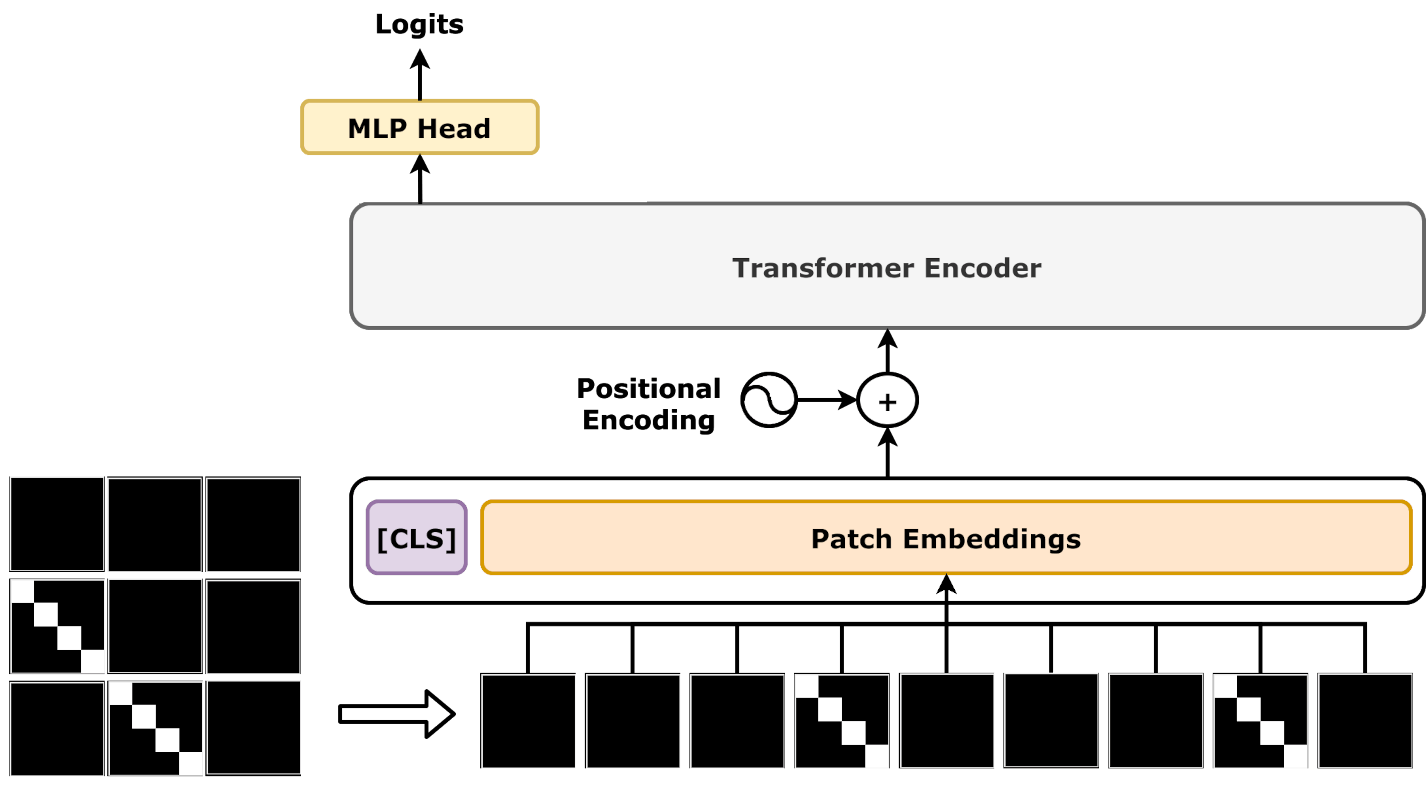
The architecture of vision transformer. An input image is divided into patches, each of which is linearly mapped through a patch embedding layer, before entering a standard Transformer encoder.

A vision transformer (ViT) is a transformer designed for computer vision. A ViT decomposes an input image into a series of patches (rather than text into tokens), serializes each patch into a vector, and maps it to a smaller dimension with a single matrix multiplication. These vector embeddings are then processed by a transformer encoder as if they were token embeddings.

ViTs were designed as alternatives to convolutional neural networks (CNNs) in computer vision applications. They have different inductive biases, training stability, and data efficiency. Compared to CNNs, ViTs are less data efficient, but have higher capacity. Some of the largest modern computer vision models are ViTs, such as one with 22B parameters.

Subsequent to its publication, many variants were proposed, with hybrid architectures with both features of ViTs and CNNs. ViTs have found application in image recognition, image segmentation, weather prediction, and autonomous driving.

== History ==
Transformers were introduced in Attention Is All You Need (2017), and have found widespread use in natural language processing. A 2019 paper applied ideas from the Transformer to computer vision. Specifically, they started with a ResNet, a standard convolutional neural network used for computer vision, and replaced all convolutional kernels by the self-attention mechanism found in a Transformer. It resulted in superior performance. However, it is not a Vision Transformer.

In 2020, an encoder-only transformer was adapted for computer vision, yielding the ViT, which reached state of the art in image classification, overcoming the previous dominance of CNN. The masked autoencoder (2022) extended ViT to work with unsupervised training. The vision transformer and the masked autoencoder, in turn, stimulated new developments in convolutional neural networks.

Subsequently, there was cross-fertilization between the previous CNN approach and the ViT approach.

In 2021, some important variants of the Vision Transformers were proposed. These variants are mainly intended to be more efficient, more accurate or better suited to a specific domain. Two studies improved efficiency and robustness of ViT by adding a CNN as a preprocessor. The Swin Transformer achieved state-of-the-art results on some object detection datasets such as COCO, by using convolution-like sliding windows of attention mechanism, and the pyramid process in classical computer vision.

== Overview ==
Vision Transformer architecture, showing the encoder-only Transformer blocks inside

The basic architecture, used by the original 2020 paper, is as follows. In summary, it is a BERT-like encoder-only Transformer.

The input image is of type $\R^{H\times W \times C}$, where $H, W, C$ are height, width, channel (RGB). It is then split into square-shaped patches of type $\R^{P\times P \times C}$.

For each patch, the patch is pushed through a linear operator, to obtain a vector ("patch embedding"). The position of the patch is also transformed into a vector by "position encoding" (the paper tried no embedding, 1D embedding, 2D embedding, and relative embedding: 1D was adopted). (Note: All positional embeddings in Dosovitskiy et al. (2021) all performed better than no embedding. They were not very different from each other, though 1D has a slight advantage in score.) The two vectors are added, then pushed through several Transformer encoders.

The attention mechanism in a ViT repeatedly transforms representation vectors of image patches, incorporating more and more semantic relations between image patches in an image. This is analogous to how in natural language processing, as representation vectors flow through a transformer, they incorporate more and more semantic relations between words, from syntax to semantics.

The above architecture turns an image into a sequence of vector representations. To use these for downstream applications, an additional head needs to be trained to interpret them.

For example, to use it for classification, one can add a shallow MLP on top of it that outputs a probability distribution over classes. The original paper uses a linear-GeLU-linear-softmax network.

== Variants ==
=== Original ViT ===
Animation of ViT. The 0th token is the special <CLS>. The other 9 patches are projected by a linear layer before being fed into the Transformer encoder as input tokens 1 to 9.

The original ViT was an encoder-only Transformer supervise-trained to predict the image label from the patches of the image. As in the case of BERT, it uses a special token <CLS> in the input side, and the corresponding output vector is used as the only input of the final output MLP head. The special token is an architectural hack to allow the model to compress all information relevant for predicting the image label into one vector.

Transformers found their initial applications in natural language processing tasks, as demonstrated by language models such as BERT and GPT-3. By contrast the typical image processing system uses a convolutional neural network (CNN). Well-known projects include Xception, ResNet, EfficientNet, DenseNet, and Inception.

Transformers measure the relationships between pairs of input tokens (words in the case of text strings), termed attention. The cost is quadratic in the number of tokens. For images, the basic unit of analysis is the pixel. However, computing relationships for every pixel pair in a typical image is prohibitive in terms of memory and computation. Instead, ViT computes relationships among pixels in various small sections of the image (e.g., 16x16 pixels), at a drastically reduced cost. The sections (with positional embeddings) are placed in a sequence. The embeddings are learnable vectors. Each section is arranged into a linear sequence and multiplied by the embedding matrix. The result, with the position embedding is fed to the transformer.

=== Architectural improvements ===
==== Pooling ====
After the ViT processes an image, it produces some embedding vectors. These must be converted to a single class probability prediction by some kind of network. In the original ViT and Masked Autoencoder, they used a dummy [CLS] token, in emulation of the BERT language model. The output at [CLS] is the classification token, which is then processed by a LayerNorm-feedforward-softmax module into a probability distribution.

Global average pooling (GAP) does not use the dummy token, but simply takes the average of all output tokens as the classification token. It was mentioned in the original ViT as being equally good.

Multihead attention pooling (MAP) applies a multiheaded attention block to pooling. Specifically, it takes as input a list of vectors $x_1, x_2, \dots, x_n$, which might be thought of as the output vectors of a layer of a ViT. The output from MAP is $\mathrm{MultiheadedAttention}(Q, V, V)$, where $q$ is a trainable query vector, and $V$ is the matrix with rows being $x_1, x_2, \dots, x_n$. This was first proposed in the Set Transformer architecture.

Later papers demonstrated that GAP and MAP both perform better than BERT-like pooling. A variant of MAP was proposed as class attention, which applies MAP, then feedforward, then MAP again.

Re-attention was proposed to allow training deep ViT. It changes the multiheaded attention module.

=== Masked Autoencoder ===
Masked Autoencoder architecture

The Masked Autoencoder took inspiration from denoising autoencoders and context encoders. It has two ViTs put end-to-end. The first one ("encoder") takes in image patches with positional encoding, and outputs vectors representing each patch. The second one (called "decoder", even though it is still an encoder-only Transformer) takes in vectors with positional encoding and outputs image patches again.

The masked denoising objective is the same as that of BERT, and indeed, a similar architecture was BERT ViT (BEiT), published concurrently.

==== Training ====
During training, input images (224px x 224 px in the original implementation) are split along a designated number of lines on each axis, producing image patches. A certain percentage of patches are selected to be masked out by mask tokens, while all others are retained in the image. The network is tasked with reconstructing the image from the remaining unmasked patches. Mask tokens in the original implementation are learnable vector quantities. A linear projection with positional embeddings is then applied to the vector of unmasked patches. Experiments varying mask ratio on networks trained on the ImageNet-1K dataset found 75% mask ratios achieved high performance on both finetuning and linear-probing of the encoder's latent space. The MAE processes only unmasked patches during training, increasing the efficiency of data processing in the encoder and lowering the memory usage of the transformer.

A less computationally-intensive ViT is used for the decoder in the original implementation of the MAE. Masked patches are added back to the output of the encoder block as mask tokens and both are fed into the decoder. A reconstruction loss is computed for the masked patches to assess network performance.

==== Prediction ====
In prediction, the decoder architecture is discarded entirely. The input image is split into patches by the same algorithm as in training, but no patches are masked out. A linear projection with a positional embedding is applied to each patch, and the resulting embedding vector representations of each patch are fed to the encoder.

=== DINO ===
Like the Masked Autoencoder, the DINO (self-distillation with no labels) method is a way to train a ViT by self-supervision. DINO is a form of teacher-student self-distillation. In DINO, the student is the model itself, and the teacher is an exponential average of the student's past states. The method is similar to previous works like momentum contrast and bootstrap your own latent (BYOL).

The loss function used in DINO is the cross-entropy loss between the output of the teacher network ($f_{\theta'_t}$) and the output of the student network ($f_{\theta_t}$). The teacher network is an exponentially decaying average of the student network's past parameters: $\theta'_t = \alpha \theta_t + \alpha(1-\alpha) \theta_{t-1} + \cdots$. The inputs to the networks are two different crops of the same image, represented as $T(x)$ and $T'(x)$, where $x$ is the original image. The loss function is written as
$$L(f_{\theta'_t}(T(x)), f_{\theta_t}(T'(x)))$$
One issue is that the network can "collapse" by always outputting the same value ($y$), regardless of the input. To prevent this collapse, DINO employs two strategies:

- Sharpening: The teacher network's output is sharpened using a softmax function with a lower temperature. This makes the teacher more "confident" in its predictions, forcing the student to learn more meaningful representations to match the teacher's sharpened output.
- Centering: The teacher network's output is centered by averaging it with its previous outputs. This prevents the teacher from becoming biased towards any particular output value, encouraging the student to learn a more diverse set of features.

In April 2023, Meta AI Research released an updated version called DINOv2 with improvements in architecture, loss function, and optimization technique. It was trained on a larger and more diverse dataset. The features learned by DINOv2 were more transferable, meaning it had better performance in downstream tasks.

In August 2025, Meta AI Research released DINOv3, an update to DINOv2. It introduced image-text alignment like CLIP. It scaled up the model to 7B parameters and the training dataset to 1.7B images (obtained by diversity-sampling an initial dataset with 17B images). Architecturally, it introduced two improvements: Gram anchoring and axial RoPE (Rotary Positional Embeddings) with jittering. Gram anchoring applies teacher-student self-distillation for the Gram matrix between the feature vectors of the patches of an image. It avoids the previously observed problem of degradation of dense feature maps: While performance on global tasks (like classification) continued to improve, performance on dense tasks (like segmentation) would peak early and then decline, with feature maps becoming noisy. Axial RoPE makes the model more robust to varying image resolutions, scales, and aspect ratios.

=== Swin Transformer ===
The Swin Transformer ("Shifted windows") took inspiration from standard CNNs:

- Instead of performing self-attention over the entire sequence of tokens, one for each patch, it performs "shifted window based" self-attention, which means only performing attention over square-shaped blocks of patches. One block of patches is analogous to the receptive field of one convolution.
- After every few attention blocks, there is a "merge layer", which merges neighboring 2x2 tokens into a single token. This is analogous to pooling (by 2x2 convolution kernels, with stride 2). Merging means concatenation followed by multiplication with a matrix.

It is improved by Swin Transformer V2, which modifies upon the ViT by a different attention mechanism:

- LayerNorm immediately after each attention and feedforward layer ("res-post-norm");
- scaled cosine attention to replace the original dot product attention;
- log-spaced continuous relative position bias, which allows transfer learning across different window resolutions.

=== TimeSformer ===
The TimeSformer was designed for video understanding tasks, and it applied a factorized self-attention, similar to the factorized convolution kernels found in the Inception CNN architecture. Schematically, it divides a video into frames, and each frame into a square grid of patches (same as ViT). Let each patch coordinate be denoted by $x, y, t$, denoting horizontal, vertical, and time.

- A space attention layer is a self-attention layer where each query patch $q_{x, y, t}$ attends to only the key and value patches $k_{x', y', t'}, v_{x', y', t'}$ such that $t = t'$.
- A time attention layer is where the requirement is $x' = x, y' = y$ instead.

The TimeSformer also considered other attention layer designs, such as the "height attention layer" where the requirement is $x' = x, t' = t$. However, they found empirically that the best design interleaves one space attention layer and one time attention layer.

=== ViT-VQGAN ===
In ViT-VQGAN, there are two ViT encoders and a discriminator. One encodes 8x8 patches of an image into a list of vectors, one for each patch. The vectors can only come from a discrete set of "codebook", as in vector quantization. Another encodes the quantized vectors back to image patches. The training objective attempts to make the reconstruction image (the output image) faithful to the input image. The discriminator (usually a convolutional network, but other networks are allowed) attempts to decide if an image is an original real image, or a reconstructed image by the ViT.

The idea is essentially the same as vector quantized variational autoencoder (VQVAE) plus generative adversarial network (GAN).

After such a ViT-VQGAN is trained, it can be used to code an arbitrary image into a list of symbols, and code an arbitrary list of symbols into an image. The list of symbols can be used to train into a standard autoregressive transformer (like GPT), for autoregressively generating an image. Further, one can take a list of caption-image pairs, convert the images into strings of symbols, and train a standard GPT-style transformer. Then at test time, one can just give an image caption, and have it autoregressively generate the image. This is the structure of Google Parti.

=== Others ===
Other examples include the visual transformer, CoAtNet, CvT, the data-efficient ViT (DeiT), etc.

In the Transformer in Transformer architecture, the image is divided into big patches, and the big patches are divided into small patches. Each layer applies a vision Transformer on each big patch embedding separately using the small patches, then applies another vision Transformer layer over the big patch embeddings.

Siamese MAE is a Siamese network version of MAE, applied to video data. It has two Transformers, one the encoder and one the decoder. During training, each step samples two frames from one video. A majority of the patches (~95%) in the future frame are masked, but all patches in the past frame are unmasked. The same encoder is run on the past, and on the future, separately. The decoder has two types of attentions: cross-attention to the past patch embeddings, and self-attention to the future patch embeddings. The decoder only reconstructs future patches.

== Comparison with CNNs ==
Typically, ViT uses patch sizes larger than standard CNN kernels (3x3 to 7x7). ViT is more sensitive to the choice of the optimizer, hyperparameters, and network depth. Preprocessing with a layer of smaller-size, overlapping (stride < size) convolutional filters helps with performance and stability.

This different behavior seems to derive from the different inductive biases they possess:

- CNN applies the same set of filters for processing the entire image. This allows them to be more data efficient and less sensitive to local perturbations.
- ViT applies self-attention, allowing them to easily capture long-range relationships between patches. They also require more data to train, but they can ingest more training data compared to CNN, which might not improve after training on a large enough training dataset. ViT also appears more robust to input image distortions such as adversarial patches or permutations.

== Applications ==
ViT have been used in many computer vision tasks with excellent results and in some cases even state-of-the-art, such as in image classification, object detection, video deepfake detection, image segmentation, anomaly detection, image synthesis, cluster analysis, autonomous driving, and radio map estimation.

ViT had been used for image generation as backbones for GAN and for diffusion models (diffusion transformer, or DiT).

DINO has been demonstrated to learn useful representations for clustering images and exploring morphological profiles on biological datasets, such as images generated with the Cell Painting assay.

In 2024, a 113 billion-parameter ViT model was designed (the largest ViT to date) for weather and climate prediction, and trained on the Frontier supercomputer with a throughput of 1.6 exaFLOPs.

== See also ==
- Transformer (machine learning model)
- Convolutional neural network
- Attention (machine learning)
- Perceiver
- Deep learning
- PyTorch
- TensorFlow
