= T5 (language model) =

Series of large language models developed by Google AI

Text-to-Text Transfer Transformer (T5)
- Original author: Google AI
- Release: 23 October 2019; 7 years ago
- Stable release: T5X github.com/google-research/t5x
- Type: Large language model; Transformer (deep learning architecture)
- License: Apache-2.0
- Website: blog.research.google/2020/02/exploring-transfer-learning-with-t5.html
- Repository: https://github.com/google-research/text-to-text-transfer-transformer

T5 (Text-to-Text Transfer Transformer) is a series of large language models developed by Google AI introduced in 2019. Like the original Transformer model, T5 models are encoder-decoder Transformers, where the encoder processes the input text, and the decoder generates the output text.

T5 models are usually pretrained on a massive dataset of text and code, after which they can perform the text-based tasks that are similar to their pretrained tasks. They can also be finetuned to perform other tasks.

T5 models have been employed in various applications, including chatbots, machine translation systems, text summarization tools, code generation, and robotics.

== Training ==
The original T5 models are pre-trained on the Colossal Clean Crawled Corpus (C4), containing text and code scraped from the internet. This pre-training process enables the models to learn general language understanding and generation abilities. T5 models can then be fine-tuned on specific downstream tasks, adapting their knowledge to perform well in various applications.

The T5 models were pretrained on many tasks, all in the format of <input text> -> <output text>.

How a T5 can be finetuned for a summarization task.

Some examples are:

- restoring corrupted text: Thank you <X> me to your party <Y> week. -> <X> for inviting <Y> last <Z>, where the <Z> means "end of output", and the <X> and <Y> denote blanks to be filled, called "sentinels" in the original report.
- translation: translate English to German: That is good. -> Das ist gut..
- judging the grammatical acceptability of a sentence (CoLA sentence): The course is jumping well. -> not acceptable .

== Architecture ==
T5 encoder-decoder structure, showing the attention structure. In the encoder self-attention (lower square), all input tokens attend to each other; In the encoder–decoder cross-attention (upper rectangle), each target token attends to all input tokens; In the decoder self-attention (upper triangle), each target token attends to present and past target tokens only (causal).

The T5 series encompasses several models with varying sizes and capabilities, all encoder-decoder Transformers, where the encoder processes the input text, and the decoder generates the output text.

These models are often distinguished by their parameter count, which indicates the complexity and potential capacity of the model. The original paper reported the following 5 models:

T5 properties (Note: import torch from transformers import AutoConfig, AutoModelForSeq2SeqLM def count_parameters(model):     enc = sum(p.numel() for p in model.encoder.parameters())     dec = sum(p.numel() for p in model.decoder.parameters())     total = enc + dec     return total, enc, dec for name in ["t5-small", "t5-base", "t5-large", "t5-3b", "t5-11b"]:     print(f"Model: {name}")     config = AutoConfig.from_pretrained(f"google-t5/{name}")     torch_dtype = torch.float16     model = AutoModelForSeq2SeqLM.from_config(config,                                               torch_dtype=torch_dtype)     total, enc, dec = count_parameters(model)     print(f"Total number of parameters in {name}: {total}")     print(f"Total number of parameters in encoder: {enc}")     print(f"Total number of parameters in decoder: {dec}")     del model)
Name	Total parameters	Encoder parameters	Decoder parameters	$n_{\text{layer}}$	$d_{\text{model}}$	$d_{\text{ff}}$	$d_{\text{kv}}$	$n_{\text{head}}$
Small	76,956,160	35,330,816	41,625,344	6	512	2048	64	8
Base	247,577,856	109,628,544	137,949,312	12	768	3072	64	12
Large	770,567,168	334,939,648	435,627,520	24	1024	4096	64	16
3B	2,884,497,408	1,240,909,824	1,643,587,584	24	1024	16384	128	32
11B	11,340,220,416	4,864,791,552	6,475,428,864	24	1024	65536	128	128

^{*The encoder and the decoder have the same shape. So for example, the T5-small has 6 layers in the encoder and 6 layers in the decoder.}

In the above table,

- $n_{\text{layer}}$: Number of layers in the encoder; also, number of layers in the decoder. They always have the same number of layers.
- $n_{\text{head}}$: Number of attention heads in each attention block.
- $d_{\text{model}}$: Dimension of the embedding vectors.
- $d_{\text{ff}}$: Dimension of the feedforward network within each encoder and decoder layer.
- $d_{\text{kv}}$: Dimension of the key and value vectors used in the self-attention mechanism.

Note that unlike typical Transformers, the 3B and 11B models do not satisfy $d_{\text{model}} = d_{\text{kv}} n_{\text{head}}$.

Compared to the original Transformer, it uses a few minor modifications: layer normalization with no additive bias; placing the layer normalization outside the residual path; relative positional embedding.

For all experiments, they used a WordPiece tokenizer, with vocabulary size 32,000. The tokenizer is shared across both the input and output of each model. It was trained on a mixture of English, German, French, and Romanian data from the C4 dataset, at a ratio of 10:1:1:1.

== Variants ==
Several subsequent models used the T5 architecture, with non-standardized naming conventions used to differentiate them. This section attempts to collect the main ones. An exhaustive list of the variants released by Google Brain is on the GitHub repo for T5X.

Some models are trained from scratch while others are trained by starting with a previous trained model. By default, each model is trained from scratch, except otherwise noted.

- T5 small, base, large, 3B, 11B (2019): The original models.
- T5 1.1 small, base, large, XL, XXL: Improved versions of the original T5 series. These have roughly equal parameters. The activation function is GEGLU instead of ReLU. The 3B and the 11B were changed to "XL" and "XXL", and their shapes are changed:

T5 v1.1 properties (Note: import torch from transformers import AutoConfig, AutoModelForSeq2SeqLM def count_parameters(model):     enc = sum(p.numel() for p in model.encoder.parameters())     dec = sum(p.numel() for p in model.decoder.parameters())     total = enc + dec     return total, enc, dec for name in ["small", "base", "large", "xl", "xxl"]:     print(f"Model: {name}")     config = AutoConfig.from_pretrained(f"google/t5-v1_1-{name}")     torch_dtype = torch.float16     model = AutoModelForSeq2SeqLM.from_config(config,                                               torch_dtype=torch_dtype)     total, enc, dec = count_parameters(model)     print(f"Total number of parameters in {name}: {total}")     print(f"Total number of parameters in encoder: {enc}")     print(f"Total number of parameters in decoder: {dec}")     del model)
Name	Total parameters	Encoder parameters	Decoder parameters	$n_{\text{layer}}$	$d_{\text{model}}$	$d_{\text{ff}}$	$d_{\text{kv}}$	$n_{\text{head}}$
Small	76,961,152	35,332,800	41,628,352	8	512	1024	64	6
Base	247,577,856	109,628,544	137,949,312	12	768	2048	64	12
Large	783,150,080	341,231,104	441,918,976	24	1024	2816	64	16
XL	2,849,757,184	1,223,527,424	1,626,229,760	24	2048	5120	64	32
XXL	11,135,332,352	4,762,310,656	6,373,021,696	24	4096	10240	64	64

- LM-adapted T5 (2021): a series of models (from small to XXL) that started from checkpoints of the T5 series, but trained further on 100B additional tokens from C4.
- Switch Transformer (2021): a mixture-of-experts variant of T5, by replacing the feedforward layers in the encoder and decoder blocks with mixture of expert feedforward layers.
- T0 3B, 11B (2021): a series of models that started from checkpoints of LM-adapted T5, and further trained to perform tasks based only on task instruction (zero-shot). Different entries in the series uses different finetuning data.
- ByT5 (2021): a byte-level version of T5, trained on mC4 (multilingual C4) dataset. It operates on text encoded as UTF-8 bytes, without tokenizers.
- Flan-T5-XL (2022): a model that started with a checkpoint of T5 XL, then instruction-tuned on the FLAN dataset.
- T5X (2022): a JAX-based re-implementation of the original T5 codebase. It is not a model. The original T5 codebase was implemented in TensorFlow with MeshTF.
- UL2 20B (2022): a model with the same architecture as the T5 series, but scaled up to 20B, and trained with "mixture of denoisers" objective on the C4. It was trained on a TPU cluster by accident, when a training run was left running accidentally for a month.
- Flan-UL2 20B (2022): UL2 20B instruction-finetuned on the FLAN dataset.
- Pile-T5 (2024): has the same architecture of T5, except it used the Llama tokenizer. It was trained on The Pile. It came in sizes of base, large, XL, XXL.

== Applications ==
The T5 model itself is an encoder-decoder model, allowing it to be used for instruction following. The encoder encodes the instruction, and the decoder autoregressively generates the reply.

The T5 encoder can be used as a text encoder, much like BERT. It encodes a text into a sequence of real-number vectors, which can be used for downstream applications. For example, Google Imagen uses T5-XXL as text encoder, and the encoded text vectors are used as conditioning on a diffusion model. As another example, the AuraFlow diffusion model uses Pile-T5-XL.
