= OlloBot =

Chinese robotics company

- Founder: Lyn Fang
- Products: Companion robots
- Owner: Ollobot Robotics Limited
- Parent: BizConf Technology
- Website: www.ollobot.com

BizConf Technology
- Type: Public
- Traded as: SZSE: 300578
- Brand(s): OlloBot

OlloBot is a Chinese tech brand owned by Ollobot Robotics Limited. It specializes in embodied intelligence. Its robots support voice commands and touch controls, available in short-neck and long-neck versions. Oriented toward families, its robotic products focus on companionship rather than just utility. Its robots operate via the VLA model, with some models equipped with stretchable necks.

Funded by Kickstarter, OlloBot is a sub-brand within SZSE-listed BizConf Technology. Its robots are designed with non-humanoid forms. The "face" of an OlloBot robot is basically a tablet, which is used to display messages, photos, and expressions. The data of its robotic products is stored on detachable heart-shaped modules. As of May 2026, its core product is the OlloNi, a cyber pet developed for homes. The product is part plush toy and part AI robot.

== History ==
The OLLOBOT trademark was filed for U.S. registration in April 2025. In January 2026, it attended the CES Show. Subsequently, its robots were introduced to the U.S. market.

In January 2026, OlloBot launched the OlloNi, a product that does not cause allergies. In June, it participated in the Global Connect Show.
