= Gemini Robotics =

Vision-language-action model

Gemini Robotics is an advanced vision–language–action model developed by Google DeepMind. It is based on the Gemini 2.0 large language model. It is tailored for robotics applications and can understand new situations. There is a related version called Gemini Robotics–ER, which stands for embodied reasoning. The two models were launched on March 12, 2025.

On June 24, 2025, Google DeepMind released Gemini Robotics On-Device, a variant designed and optimized to run locally on robotic devices.

On July 30, 2026, Google DeepMind announced Gemini Robotics ER 2, an upgrade to its embodied reasoning model featuring real-time video understanding, task progress tracking, lower-latency orchestration via the Gemini Live API, tool integration, and multi-robot collaboration. With this release, the model was made publicly available to developers via the Gemini API and Google AI Studio.

Access to earlier Gemini Robotics models was initially restricted to trusted testers, including Agile Robots, Agility Robotics, Boston Dynamics, and Enchanted Tools.
