= Chinchilla (language model) =

Language model by DeepMind

- Developer: DeepMind
- Release: March 29, 2022
- Available in: English
- Type: Large language model

Chinchilla is a family of large language models (LLMs) developed by the research team at Google DeepMind, presented in March 2022.

== Models ==
Chinchilla is a further development of an earlier DeepMind model family named Gopher. Both model families were trained to investigate the scaling laws of large language models

It claimed to outperform GPT-3. It considerably simplifies downstream utilization because it requires much less computer power for inference and fine-tuning. Based on the training of previously employed language models, it has been determined that if one doubles the model size, one must also have twice the number of training tokens. This hypothesis has been used to train Chinchilla by DeepMind. Similar to Gopher in terms of cost, Chinchilla has 70B parameters and four times as much data (1.4T tokens vs. 300B).

Chinchilla has an average accuracy of 67.5% on the Measuring Massive Multitask Language Understanding (MMLU) benchmark, which is 7% higher than Gopher's performance. Chinchilla was still in the testing phase as of January 12, 2023.

The authors concluded that more attention should go to scaling training datasets, and that larger datasets help only when the data is of high quality.

It has been used for the Flamingo vision-language model.

== Architecture ==
Both the Gopher family and Chinchilla family are families of transformer models.

In particular, they are essentially the same as GPT-2, with different sizes and minor modifications. Gopher family uses RMSNorm instead of LayerNorm; relative positional encoding rather than absolute positional encoding. The Chinchilla family is the same as the Gopher family, but trained with AdamW instead of Adam optimizer.

The Gopher family contains six models of increasing size, from 44 million parameters to 280 billion parameters. They refer to the largest one as "Gopher" by default. Similar naming conventions apply for the Chinchilla family.

The Gopher family has the following specifications:

Model specifications for Gopher family
Parameter count	Layers	Number of heads	Key/value size	Internal dimension	Max learning rate	Batch size
44M	8	16	32	512	6 × 10^{−4}	0.25M
117M	12	12	64	768	6 × 10^{−4}	0.25M
417M	12	12	128	1,536	2 × 10^{−4}	0.25M
1.4B	24	16	128	2,048	2 × 10^{−4}	0.25M
7.1B	32	32	128	4,096	1.2 × 10^{−4}	2M
Gopher 280B	80	128	128	16,384	4 × 10^{−5}	3M → 6M

The 70-billion-parameter Chinchilla compares with Gopher 280B as follows:

Comparison between Chinchilla and Gopher
Parameter count	Layers	Number of heads	Key/value size	Internal dimension	Max learning rate	Batch size
Gopher 280B	80	128	128	16,384	4 × 10^{−5}	3M → 6M
Chinchilla 70B	80	64	128	8,192	1 × 10^{−4}	1.5M → 3M

== See also ==
- LaMDA
