= Google AI =

Google division dedicated to AI

- Type: Division
- Industry: Artificial intelligence
- Founded: 15 November 2010; 15 years ago
- Owner: Google
- Parent: Google DeepMind
- Website: ai.google

Google AI is a subsidiary of Google DeepMind dedicated to artificial intelligence (AI). It was announced in May 2017.

As of 2020, this division had research facilities in Zurich, Paris, Israel, and Beijing. In 2023, the head of Google AI head, Jeff Dean, was promoted to the position of chief scientist at Google, and Google Brain and Google DeepMind were merged.

In February 2025, Alphabet removed guidelines in their public AI ethics policy that formerly ruled out applying their AI technology to applications that were "likely to cause harm".

== History ==
Google AI was announced in May 2017 at Google I/O 2017 by CEO Sundar Pichai.

As of 2020, this division had research facilities in Zurich, Paris, Israel, and Beijing.

In March 2019, Google announced the creation of an Advanced Technology External Advisory Council (ATEAC) comprising eight members: Alessandro Acquisti, Bubacarr Bah, De Kai, Dyan Gibbens, Joanna Bryson, Kay Coles James, Luciano Floridi and William Joseph Burns. Acquisti declined the invitation to join. Hundreds of Google staff issued an open letter objecting to the appointment of Coles James, who was president of the Heritage Foundation at that time. The letter cited "anti-LGBTQ and anti-immigrant views" in calling for her appointment to be revoked. The Council was abandoned within one month of its establishment.

In 2023, Google's internal AI division, Google Brain, merged with DeepMind to form a unified entity known as Google DeepMind. DeepMind was a UK-based company that Google acquired in 2014 that operated separately from the company's core research. This was part of a reorganization initiative at Alphabet Inc. that elevated Google AI's head, Jeff Dean, to the position of chief scientist at Google. This reorganization also involved the mass layoffs of 12,000 people.

In February 2025, Alphabet removed guidelines in their public AI ethics policy that formerly ruled out applying their AI technology to applications that were "likely to cause harm".

== Projects ==
- Google Vids: AI-powered video creation for work.
- Google Assistant: a virtual assistant software application since 2023 developed by Google AI.
- Serving cloud-based TPUs (tensor processing units) in order to develop machine learning software. The TPU research cloud provides free access to a cluster of cloud TPUs to researchers engaged in open-source machine learning research.
- TensorFlow: a machine learning software library created by Google Brain in 2015.
- Magenta: a deep learning research team exploring the role of machine learning as a tool in the creative process. The team has released many open source projects allowing artists and musicians to extend their processes using AI. With the use of Magenta, musicians and composers could create high-quality music at a lower cost, making it easier for new artists to enter the industry.
- Sycamore: a 54-qubit programmable quantum processor.
- LaMDA: a family of conversational neural language models.
- The creation of datasets in under-represented languages, to facilitate the training of AI models in these languages.

=== Former ===
- Bard: a chatbot based on the Gemini model, no longer developed by Google AI since February 8, 2024, as the chatbot—now merged into the Gemini brand—is now developed by Google DeepMind.
- Duet AI: a Google Workspace integration that can notably generate text or images, no longer developed by Google AI since February 8, 2024, as the Google Workspace integration (now merged into the Gemini brand) is now developed by Google DeepMind.
- Crowdsource: a crowdsourcing platform developed by Google intended to improve a host of Google services through the data donated from users for training of different algorithms.
