= Arena.ai =

Website comparing AI chatbots based on votes

Arena
- Website type: Artificial intelligence
- Country of origin: United States
- Founders: Wei-Lin Chiang; Anastasios N. Angelopoulos; Ion Stoica
- Website: arena.ai
- Registration: Mandatory
- Launched: April 24, 2023; 3 years ago

Arena (formerly LMArena and Chatbot Arena) is a public, web-based platform that evaluates large language models (LLMs). Users enter prompts for two anonymous models to respond to and vote on the model that gave the better response, after which the models' identities are revealed. Users can also choose models to test themselves via the "Direct" selection.

Companies which have supplied the company with their large language models include OpenAI, Google DeepMind, and Anthropic.

The website has been used for preview releases of upcoming models. Chinese company DeepSeek tested its prototype models in the Arena months before its R1 model gained attention in Western media. Other notable pre-release models include OpenAI's GPT-5 under the codename "summit" and Google DeepMind's Gemini 2.5 Flash Image (an image-generation and editing model) under the codename "Nano Banana".

Research has identified specific limitations in Arena's methodology.

== History ==
Chatbot Arena was released on April 24, 2023.

In June 2024, Chatbot Arena added image support.

In September 2024, Chatbot Arena moved to its own dedicated domain name, lmarena.ai (or LMArena).

In April 2025, Meta released Llama 4. Llama 4 Maverick beat GPT-4o and Gemini 2.0 Flash on LMArena, but the version of Maverick on LMArena unfairly differed from the publicly available version. LMArena updated their policies in response.

In April 2025, LMArena incorporated as an independent company. That May, LMArena raised $100 million in a seed funding round, valuing the company at $600 million. Participants in the seed funding round included Andreessen Horowitz, UC Investments, Lightspeed Venture Partners, Felicis Ventures, and Kleiner Perkins.

On January 6, 2026, LMArena announced the closing of a $150 million Series A funding round, bringing the company’s post-money valuation to approximately $1.7 billion. The round was led by Felicis and UC Investments (University of California), with participation from Andreessen Horowitz, The House Fund, LDVP, Kleiner Perkins, Lightspeed Venture Partners, and Laude Ventures.

In January 2026, LMArena added video support.

On January 28, 2026, LMArena rebranded to "Arena".

On October 8, 2026, Arena announced it raised $200 million in a Series B funding round co-led by Lightspeed Venture Partners and Khosla Ventures, thus placing the company at a $3.1 billion valuation.
