= Alan Woodward (computer scientist) =

British computer scientist

Alan Woodward is a British computer scientist at the University of Surrey. He is a specialist in computer security and a core member of the Surrey Centre for Cyber Security.

He studied physics as an undergraduate student and conducted research in signal processing as a postgraduate student. Both of these were at the University of Southampton.

He has worked in government service, business as well as academia.

In addition to his academic qualifications, his practical accomplishments have resulted in him being elected Fellow of the Institute of Physics, a Chartered Physicist, Chartered IT Practitioner, Chartered Engineer, Fellow of the British Computer Society, a EUR ING, and Fellow of the Royal Statistical Society.
