= LaMDA =

Google large language models family

- Developer: Google Brain
- Successor: PaLM
- Available in: English
- Type: Large language model
- License: Proprietary

LaMDA (Language Model for Dialogue Applications) is a family of conversational large language models developed by Google. Originally developed and introduced as Meena in 2020, the first-generation LaMDA was announced during the 2021 Google I/O keynote, while the second generation was announced the following year.

In June 2022, LaMDA gained widespread attention when Google engineer Blake Lemoine made claims that the chatbot had become sentient. The scientific community has largely rejected Lemoine's claims, though it has led to conversations about the efficacy of the Turing test, which measures whether a computer can pass for a human. In February 2023, Google announced Gemini (then Bard), a conversational artificial intelligence chatbot powered by LaMDA, to counter the rise of OpenAI's ChatGPT.

== History ==
=== Background ===
On January 28, 2020, Google unveiled Meena, a chatbot trained on 40B words (341 GB dataset). Google claimed that the chatbot has 1.7 times greater model capacity than OpenAI's GPT-2.

The company previously hired computer scientist Ray Kurzweil in 2012 to develop multiple chatbots for the company, including one named Danielle. The Google Brain research team, who developed Meena, hoped to release the chatbot to the public in a limited capacity, but corporate executives refused on the grounds that Meena violated Google's "AI principles around safety and fairness". Meena was later renamed LaMDA as its data and computing power increased, and the Google Brain team again sought to deploy the software to the Google Assistant, the company's virtual assistant software, in addition to opening it up to a public demo. Both requests were once again denied by company leadership. LaMDA's two lead researchers, Daniel de Freitas and Noam Shazeer, eventually left the company in frustration.

=== First generation ===
Google announced the LaMDA conversational large language model during the Google I/O keynote on May 18, 2021, powered by artificial intelligence. The acronym stands for "Language Model for Dialogue Applications". Built on the seq2seq architecture, transformer-based neural networks developed by Google Research in 2017, LaMDA was trained on human dialogue and stories, allowing it to engage in open-ended conversations. Google states that responses generated by LaMDA have been ensured to be "sensible, interesting, and specific to the context". LaMDA has access to multiple symbolic text processing systems, including a database, a real-time clock and calendar, a mathematical calculator, and a natural language translation system, giving it superior accuracy in tasks supported by those systems, and making it among the first dual process chatbots. LaMDA is also not stateless because its "sensibleness" metric is fine-tuned by "pre-conditioning" each dialog turn by prepending many of the most recent dialog interactions, on a user-by-user basis. LaMDA is tuned on nine unique performance metrics: sensibleness, specificity, interestingness, safety, groundedness, informativeness, citation accuracy, helpfulness, and role consistency. Tests by Google indicated that LaMDA surpassed human responses in the area of interestingness.

The pre-training dataset consists of 2.97B documents, 1.12B dialogs, and 13.39B utterances, for a total of 1.56T words. The largest LaMDA model has 137B non-embedding parameters.

=== Second generation ===
On May 11, 2022, Google unveiled LaMDA 2, the successor to LaMDA, during the 2022 Google I/O keynote. The new incarnation of the model draws examples of text from numerous sources, using it to formulate unique "natural conversations" on topics that it may not have been trained to respond to.

=== Sentience claims ===
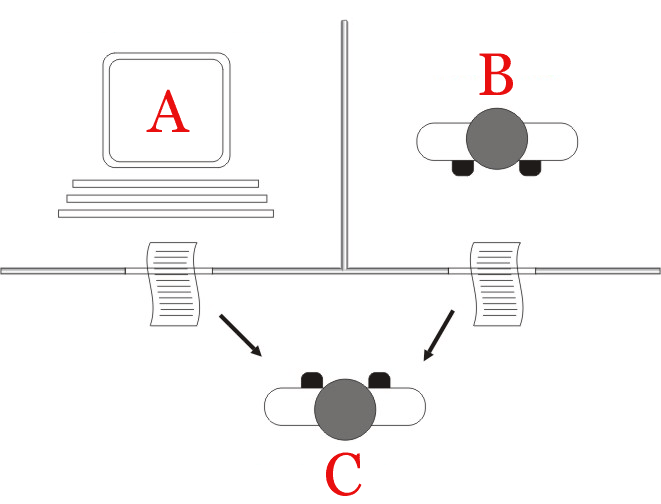
Lemoine's claims that LaMDA may be sentient has instigated discussions on whether the Turing test, pictured above, remains an accurate benchmark in determining artificial general intelligence.

On June 11, 2022, The Washington Post reported that Google engineer Blake Lemoine had been placed on paid administrative leave after Lemoine told company executives Blaise Agüera y Arcas and Jen Gennai that LaMDA had become sentient. Lemoine came to this conclusion after the chatbot made questionable responses to questions regarding self-identity, moral values, religion, and Isaac Asimov's Three Laws of Robotics. Google refuted these claims, insisting that there was substantial evidence to indicate that LaMDA was not sentient. In an interview with Wired, Lemoine reiterated his claims that LaMDA was "a person" as dictated by the Thirteenth Amendment to the U.S. Constitution, comparing it to an "alien intelligence of terrestrial origin". He further revealed that he had been dismissed by Google after he hired an attorney on LaMDA's behalf after the chatbot requested that Lemoine do so. On July 22, Google fired Lemoine, asserting that Blake had violated their policies "to safeguard product information" and rejected his claims as "wholly unfounded". Internal controversy instigated by the incident prompted Google executives to decide against releasing LaMDA to the public, which it had previously been considering.

Lemoine's claims were widely pushed back by the scientific community. Many experts rejected the idea that LaMDA was sentient, including former New York University psychology professor Gary Marcus, David Pfau of Google sister company DeepMind, Erik Brynjolfsson of the Institute for Human-Centered Artificial Intelligence at Stanford University, and University of Surrey professor Adrian Hilton. Yann LeCun, who leads Meta Platforms' AI research team, stated that neural networks such as LaMDA were "not powerful enough to attain true intelligence". University of California, Santa Cruz professor Max Kreminski noted that LaMDA's architecture did not "support some key capabilities of human-like consciousness" and that its neural network weights were "frozen", assuming it was a typical large language model. Philosopher Nick Bostrom noted, however, that the lack of precise and consensual criteria for determining whether a system is conscious warrants some uncertainty. IBM Watson lead developer David Ferrucci compared how LaMDA appeared to be human in the same way Watson did when it was first introduced. Former Google AI ethicist Timnit Gebru called Lemoine a victim of a "hype cycle" initiated by researchers and the media. Lemoine's claims have also generated discussion on whether the Turing test remained useful to determine researchers' progress toward achieving artificial general intelligence, with Will Omerus of the Post opining that the test actually measured whether machine intelligence systems were capable of deceiving humans, while Brian Christian of The Atlantic said that the controversy was an instance of the ELIZA effect.

== Products ==
=== AI Test Kitchen ===
With the unveiling of LaMDA 2 in May 2022, Google also launched the AI Test Kitchen, a mobile application for the Android operating system powered by LaMDA capable of providing lists of suggestions on-demand based on a complex goal. Originally open only to Google employees, the app was set to be made available to "select academics, researchers, and policymakers" by invitation sometime in the year. In August, the company began allowing users in the U.S. to sign up for early access. In November, Google released a "season 2" update to the app, integrating a limited form of Google Brain's Imagen text-to-image model. A third iteration of the AI Test Kitchen was in development by January 2023, expected to launch at I/O later that year. Following the 2023 I/O keynote in May, Google added MusicLM, an AI-powered music generator first previewed in January, to the AI Test Kitchen app. In August, the app was delisted from Google Play and the Apple App Store, instead moving completely online.

=== Bard ===
On February 6, 2023, Google announced Bard, a conversational AI chatbot powered by LaMDA, in response to the unexpected popularity of OpenAI's ChatGPT chatbot. Google positions the chatbot as a "collaborative AI service" rather than a search engine. Bard became available for early access on March 21.

=== Other products ===
In addition to Bard, Pichai also unveiled the company's Generative Language API, an application programming interface also based on LaMDA, which he announced would be opened up to third-party developers in March 2023.

== Architecture ==
Meena was a seq2seq encoder-decoder Transformer trained on 40B words (341 GB dataset). Its encoder uses 1 encoder-block of the Evolved Transformer, and its decoder uses 13 decoder-blocks of the Evolved Transformer. The Evolved Transformer is a variant of the original Transformer architecture optimized by neural architecture search.

LaMDA is a decoder-only Transformer language model. It is pre-trained on a text corpus that includes both documents and dialogs consisting of 1.56 trillion words, and is then trained with fine-tuning data generated by manually annotated responses for "sensibleness, interestingness, and safety".

LaMDA was retrieval-augmented to improve the accuracy of facts provided to the user.

Three different models were tested, with the largest having 137 billion non-embedding parameters:

Transformer model hyper-parameters
Parameters	Layers	Units (d_{model})	Heads
2B	10	2560	40
8B	16	4096	64
137B	64	8192	128

== See also ==
- BERT (language model)
- Gemini (language model)
