= 1982 =

1982 in various calendars
- Gregorian calendar: 1982; MCMLXXXII
- Ab urbe condita: 2735
- Armenian calendar: 1431; ԹՎ ՌՆԼԱ
- Assyrian calendar: 6732
- Baháʼí calendar: 138–139
- Balinese saka calendar: 1903–1904
- Bengali calendar: 1388–1389
- Berber calendar: 2932
- British Regnal year: 30 Eliz. 2 – 31 Eliz. 2
- Buddhist calendar: 2526
- Burmese calendar: 1344
- Byzantine calendar: 7490–7491
- Chinese calendar: 辛酉年 (Metal Rooster); 4679 or 4472 — to — 壬戌年 (Water Dog); 4680 or 4473
- Coptic calendar: 1698–1699
- Discordian calendar: 3148
- Ethiopian calendar: 1974–1975
- Hebrew calendar: 5742–5743
- Hindu calendars
- Vikram Samvat: 2038–2039
- Shaka Samvat: 1903–1904
- Kali Yuga: 5082–5083
- Holocene calendar: 11982
- Igbo calendar: 982–983
- Iranian calendar: 1360–1361
- Islamic calendar: 1402–1403
- Japanese calendar: Shōwa 57 (昭和５７年)
- Javanese calendar: 1914–1915
- Juche calendar: 71
- Julian calendar: Gregorian minus 13 days
- Korean calendar: 4315
- Minguo calendar: ROC 71 民國71年
- Nanakshahi calendar: 514
- Thai solar calendar: 2525
- Tibetan calendar: ལྕགས་མོ་བྱ་ལོ་ (female Iron-Bird); 2108 or 1727 or 955 — to — ཆུ་ཕོ་ཁྱི་ལོ་ (male Water-Dog); 2109 or 1728 or 956
- Unix time: 378691200 – 410227199

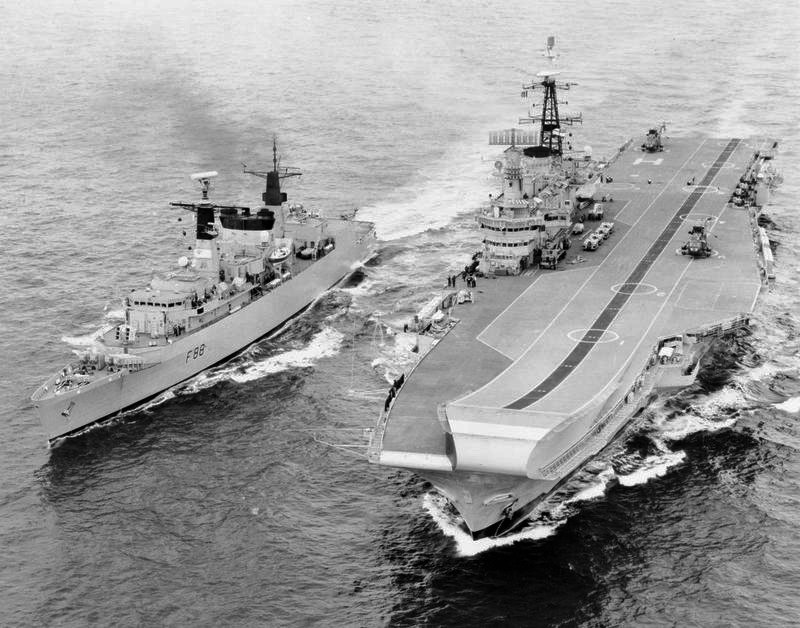
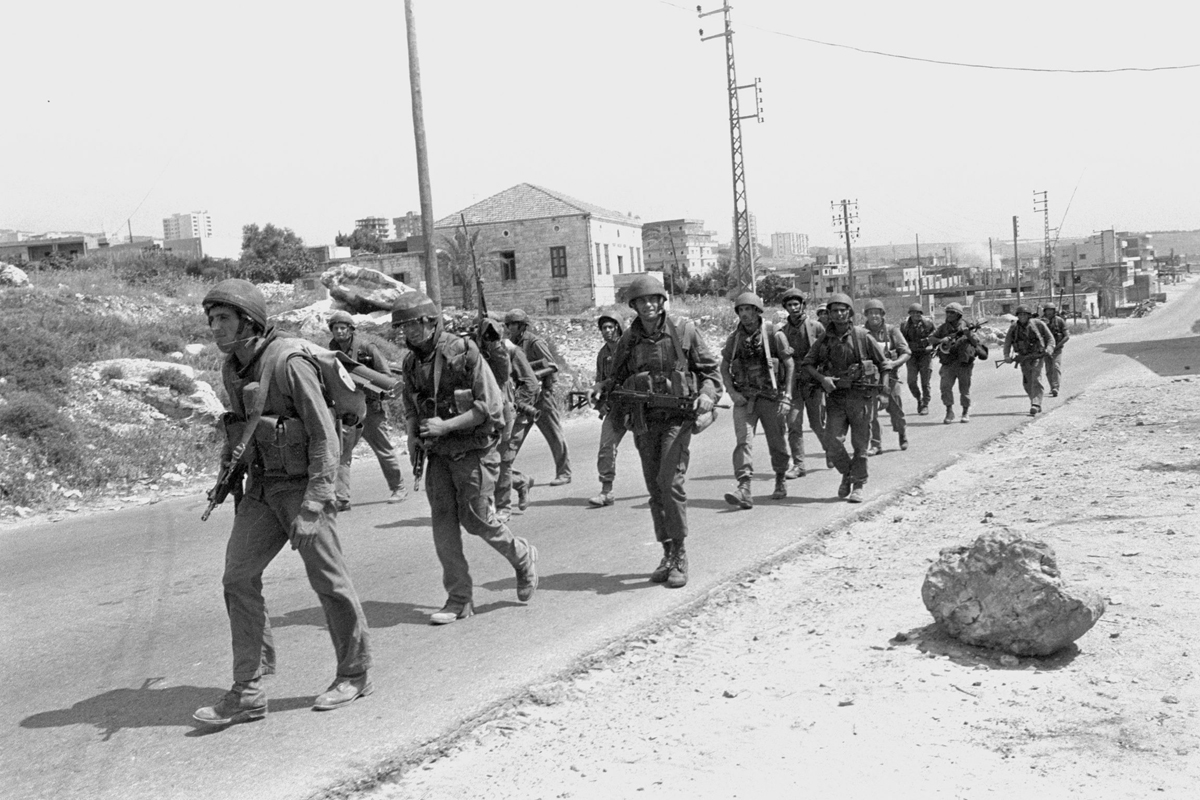
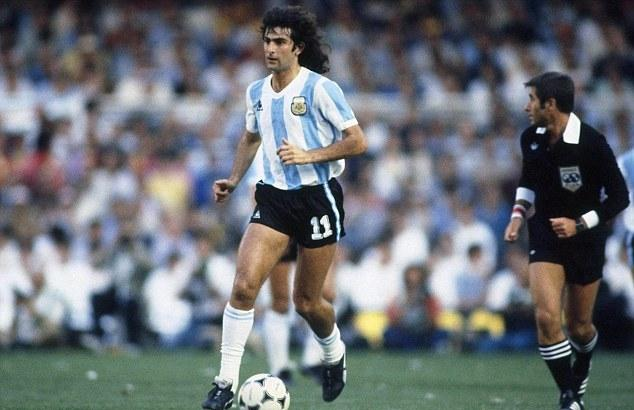
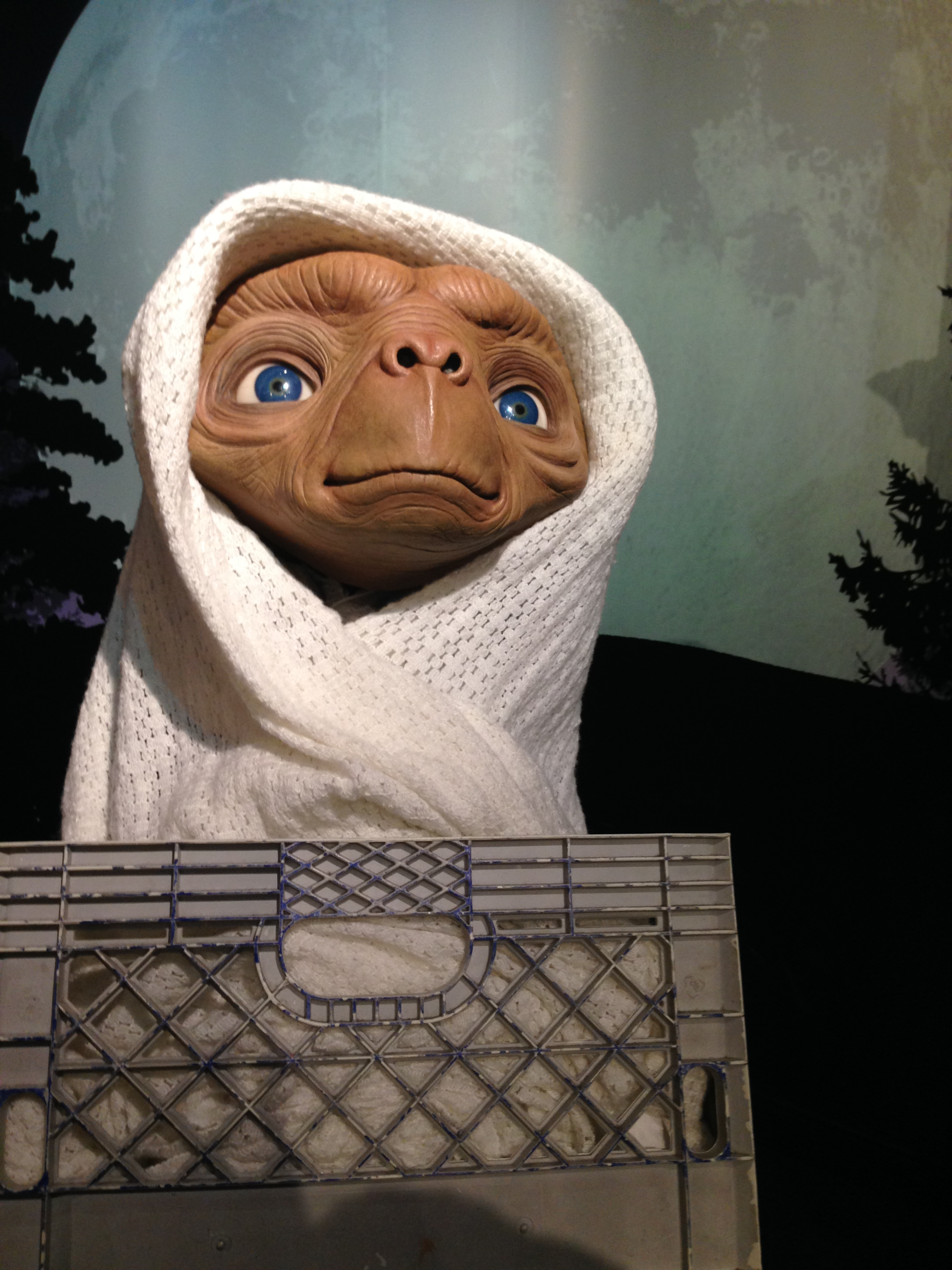
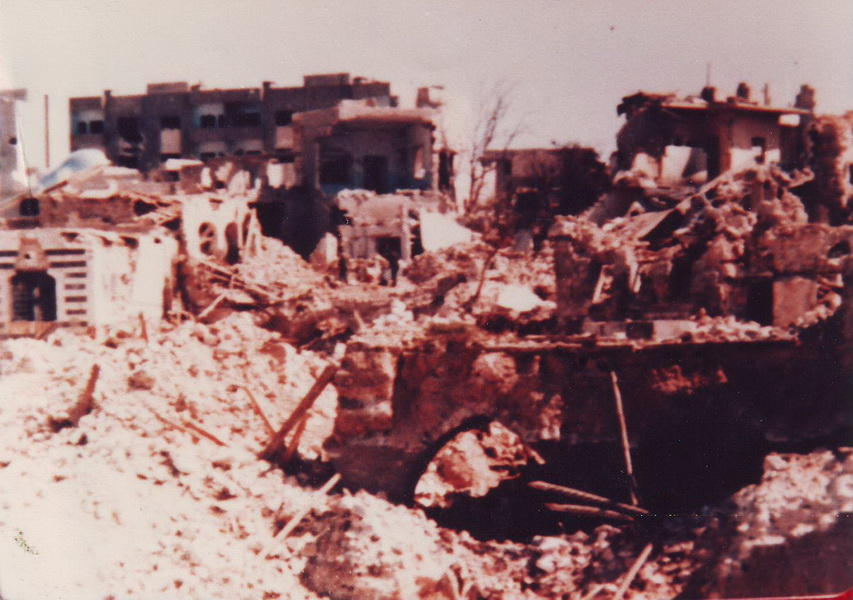
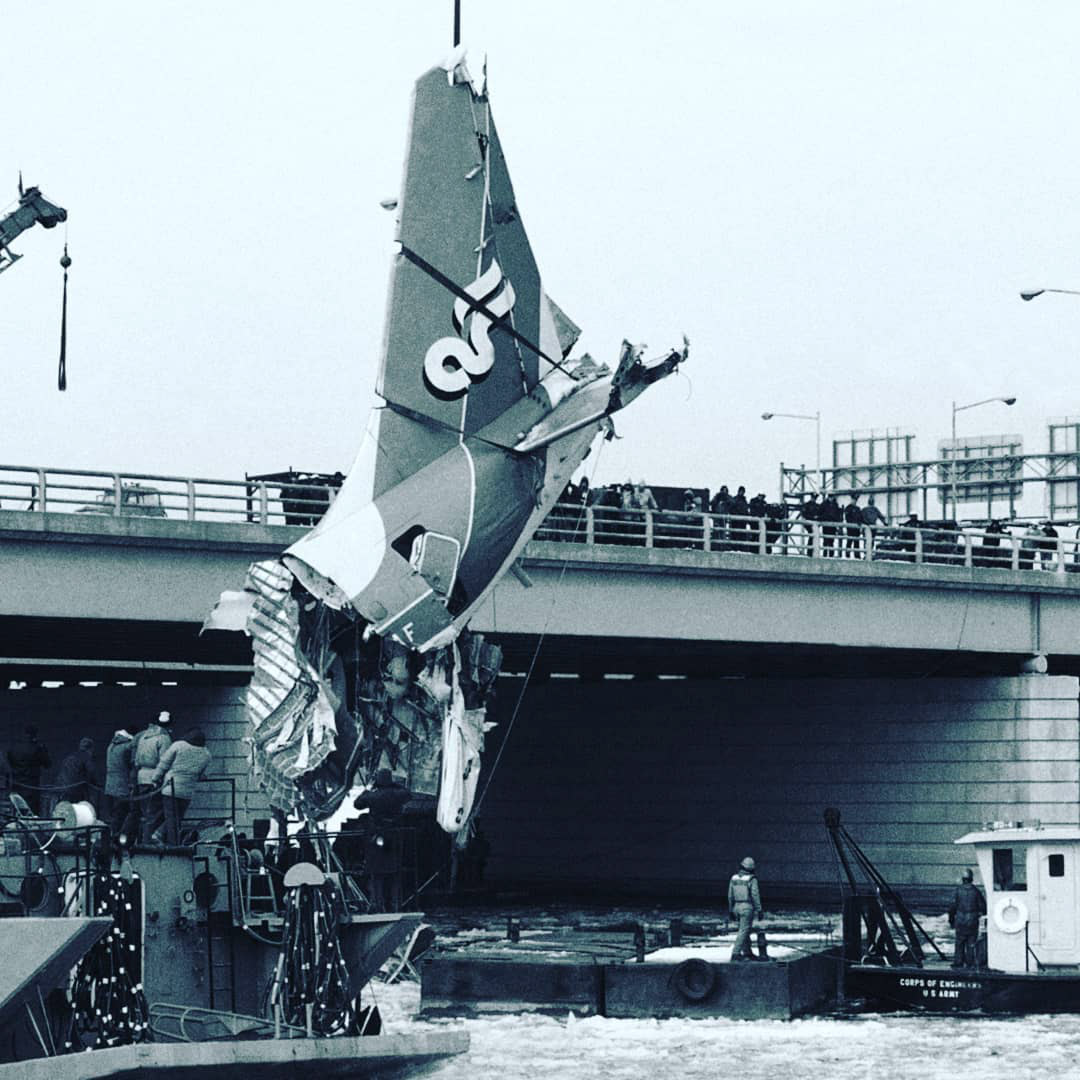
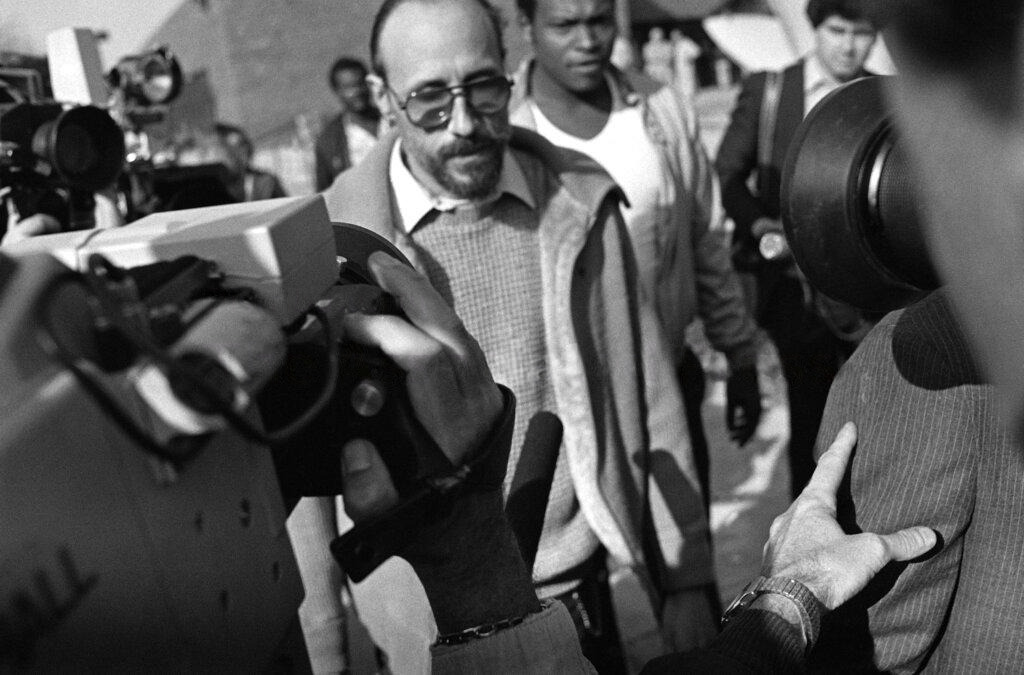
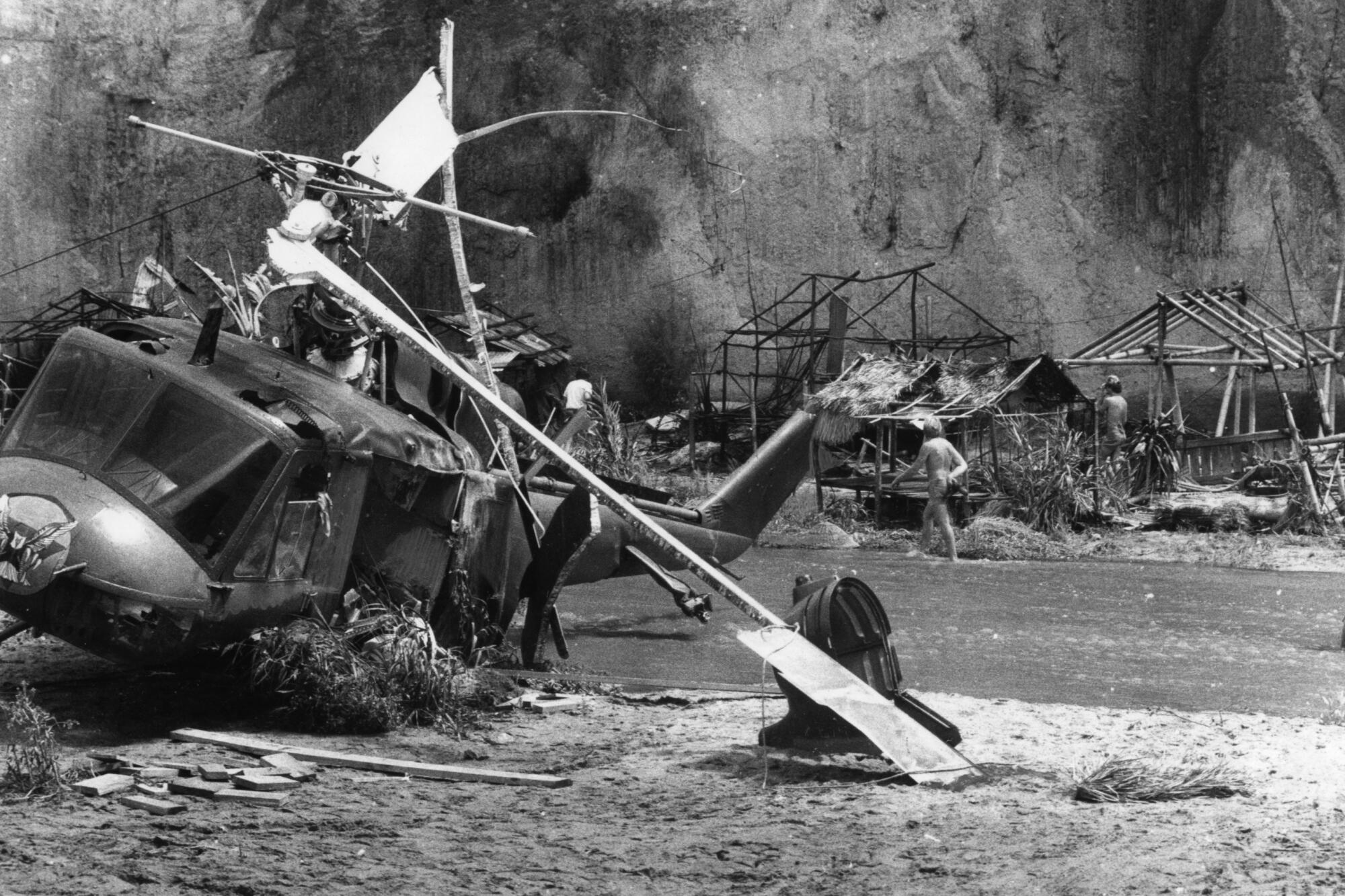
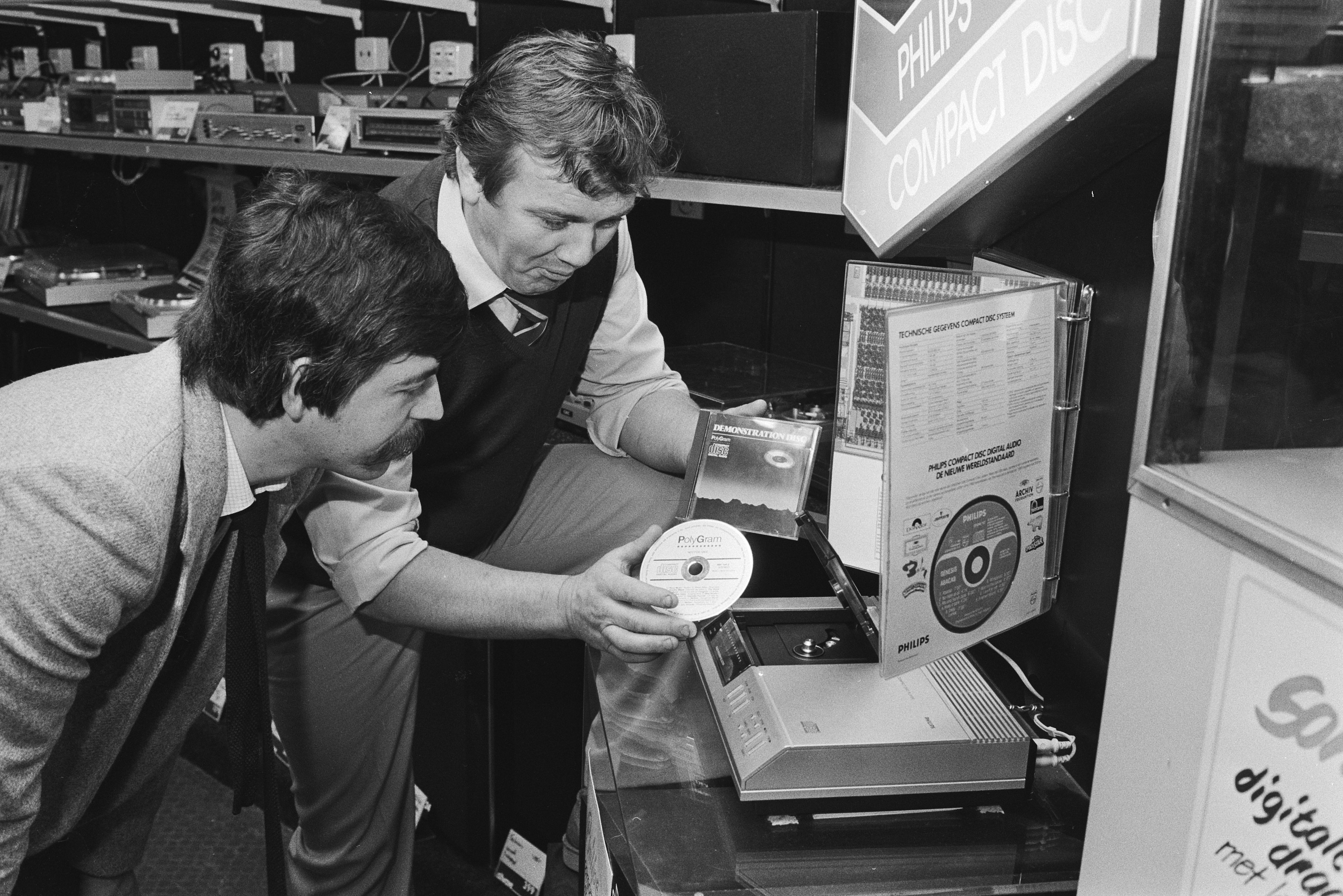
From top to bottom, left to right: the Falklands War breaks out between Argentina and the United Kingdom over the Falkland Islands; the 1982 Lebanon War begins as Israel invades Lebanon; the 1982 FIFA World Cup is held in Spain and is won by Italy; E.T. the Extra-Terrestrial becomes the highest grossing movie at the time; Hama is besieged; Air Florida Flight 90 crashes into the 14th Street Bridge in Washington, D.C., killing 80; the Chicago Tylenol murders lead to tamper-evident packaging; the Twilight Zone accident kills actor Vic Morrow and two child actors; and the CD is commercially introduced.

1982 (MCMLXXXII) was a common year starting on Friday of the Gregorian calendar, the 1982nd year of the Common Era (CE) and Anno Domini (AD) designations, the 982nd year of the 2nd millennium, the 82nd year of the 20th century, and the 3rd year of the 1980s decade.

== Events ==
=== January ===
- January 1 – In Malaysia and Singapore, clocks are adjusted to the same time zone, UTC+8 (GMT+8.00).
- January 13 – Air Florida Flight 90 crashes shortly after takeoff into the 14th Street Bridge in Washington, D.C., United States, then falls into the Potomac River, killing 78 people.
- January 14 – An Ethiopian Air Force Antonov An-26 with an unknown registration crashed near Addis Ababa, Ethiopia, killing all 73 occupants on board.
- January 18 – 1982 Thunderbirds Indian Springs Diamond Crash: Four Northrop T-38 aircraft of the United States Air Force crash at Indian Springs Air Force Auxiliary Field, Nevada, killing all 4 pilots.
- January 20 – Musician Ozzy Osbourne is treated for rabies after biting the head off a live bat during a concert in Des Moines, Iowa.
- January 24 – The San Francisco 49ers defeat the Cincinnati Bengals to win Super Bowl XVI at the Pontiac Silverdome in Pontiac, Michigan.
- January 26 – Mauno Koivisto is elected President of Finland.
- January 27 – The government of Garret FitzGerald in Ireland is defeated 82–81 on its budget; the 22nd Dáil is dissolved.
- January 30 – The first computer virus, the Elk Cloner, written by 15-year old Rich Skrenta, is found. It infects Apple II computers via floppy disk.

=== February ===
- February 1 – Senegal and The Gambia form a loose Senegambia Confederation.
- February 2 – The Hama massacre begins in Syria.
- February 3 – Syrian president Hafez al-Assad orders the army to purge the city of Harran of the Muslim Brotherhood.
- February 5 – London-based Laker Airways collapses, leaving 6,000 stranded passengers and debts of £270 million.
- February 7 – Iraqi club Al-Shorta win the 1982 Arab Club Champions Cup with a 4–2 aggregate win over Al-Nejmeh in the final.
- February 9 – Japan Airlines Flight 350 crashes in Tokyo Bay due to thrust reversal on approach to Tokyo International Airport, killing 24 among the 174 people on board.
- February 15 – The oil platform Ocean Ranger sinks during a storm off the coast of Newfoundland, killing all 84 rig workers aboard.
- February 18 – The Ireland general election gives a boost to Fianna Fáil.
- February 19 - The Boeing 757 is flown for the first time.
- February 24 – In South Africa, 22 National Party MPs, led by Andries Treurnicht, vote for no confidence in P. W. Botha.
- February 25 – The European Court of Human Rights rules that teachers who cane, belt or tawse children against the wishes of their parents are in breach of the Human Rights Convention.

=== March ===
- March 2 – Decentralisation in France: the Law of Decentralisation creates the administrative regions of France (régions).
- March 9 – Charles Haughey becomes Taoiseach of Ireland.
- March 10
  - The United States places an embargo on Libyan oil imports, alleging Libyan state-sponsored terrorism.
  - Syzygy: All 9 planets recognized at this time align on the same side of the Sun.
- March 16 – Claus von Bülow is found guilty of the attempted murder of his wife by a court in Newport, Rhode Island.
- March 18 – A legal case brought on behalf of Mary Whitehouse against the National Theatre of Britain concerning alleged obscenity in the play The Romans in Britain ends after the Attorney General intervenes.
- March 19 – Argentine scrap metal workers (infiltrated by marines) raise the flag of Argentina on South Georgia and the Falkland Islands, two British overseas territories.
- March 24 – Hussain Muhammad Ershad seizes power in Bangladesh.
- March 29
  - Royal Assent is given to the Canada Act 1982, setting the stage for the repatriation of the Canadian Constitution on April 17.
  - The 54th Academy Awards, hosted by Johnny Carson, are held at the Dorothy Chandler Pavilion in Los Angeles. Chariots of Fire wins Best Picture and 3 other Academy Awards.
  - Freshman Michael Jordan hits a jumper with 17 seconds remaining to lift the North Carolina Tar Heels to a 63–62 win over the Georgetown Hoyas in the 1982 NCAA Division I men's basketball championship game at the Louisiana Superdome in New Orleans.
- March 30 – Space Shuttle Columbia ends an eight-day mission, STS-3, by landing at White Sands Space Harbor near Alamogordo, New Mexico. It is the only time a Space Shuttle has landed at White Sands. The orbiter was forced to land here due to flooding at its originally planned landing site, Edwards Air Force Base in California.

=== April ===
- April 1 – The 1982 invasion of the Falkland Islands begins when Argentine forces land near Stanley, beginning the Falklands War.
- April 2 – Rex Hunt, the British governor of the Falkland Islands, surrenders the islands to Argentine forces, leading to their occupation.
- April 3 – Invasion of the Falkland Islands: Argentine forces begin the invasion of South Georgia.
- April 17 – Canadian Charter of Rights and Freedoms: By Proclamation of the Queen of Canada on Parliament Hill, Canada patriates its constitution, gaining full political independence from the United Kingdom; included is the country's first entrenched bill of rights.
- April 24 – German singer Nicole wins the Eurovision Song Contest 1982 (held in Britain) with the song Ein Bisschen Frieden.
- April 25 – Israel completes its withdrawal from the Sinai Peninsula in accordance with the Egypt–Israel peace treaty of 1979.
- April 26
  - Falklands War: British troops retake South Georgia Island during Operation Paraquet.
  - From 26 to 27 April, policeman Woo Bum-kon goes on a killing spree in Uiryeong County, South Korea. By the early morning of April 27, after killing at least 56 people with several firearms and grenades, he kills himself via grenade. It becomes the deadliest spree shooting in recorded history up until the 2011 Norway attacks.
- April 30 – The Bijon Setu massacre takes place in broad daylight at a railway crossing in India.

=== May ===
- May 1 – A crowd of over 100,000 attends the first day of the 1982 World's Fair in Knoxville, Tennessee, which is kicked off with an address by President Ronald Reagan. Over 11 million people attend during its six-month run.
- May 2
  - Falklands War: The British nuclear submarine HMS Conqueror sinks the Argentine cruiser General Belgrano, killing 323 sailors. Operation Algeciras, an attempt to destroy a Royal Navy warship in Gibraltar, fails.
  - The Weather Channel airs on cable television in the United States as the first 24-hour all-weather network.
- May 4 – Falklands War: HMS Sheffield is hit by an Argentine Exocet missile and burns out of control; 20 sailors are killed. The ship sinks on May 10.
- May 8 – French-Canadian racing driver Gilles Villeneuve is killed during qualifying for the 1982 Belgian Grand Prix.
- May 12 – Spanish priest Juan María Fernández y Krohn tries to stab Pope John Paul II with a bayonet during the latter's pilgrimage to the shrine at Fátima.
- May 16 – The New York Islanders sweep the Vancouver Canucks in four games to win the 1982 Stanley Cup Final in ice hockey.
- May 18 – Falklands War: The British Special Air Service launches Operation Plum Duff, a reconnaissance mission preliminary to Operation Mikado, which is planned to destroy three Argentinean Exocet missiles and five Super Étendard fighter-bombers. Both Operation Plum Duff and Operation Mikado are called off after the Plum Duff insertion is revealed by a helicopter landing in Chile.
- May 21
  - Falklands War: HMS Ardent is sunk by Argentine aircraft, killing 22 sailors.
  - The International Maritime Organization (IMO) is established.
- May 23 – Falklands War: HMS Antelope is lost.
- May 24
  - Iran-Iraq War: Iranian troops retake Khorramshahr.
  - KGB head Yuri Andropov is appointed to the Secretariat of the Communist Party of the Soviet Union.
- May 25 – British ships HMS Coventry and SS Atlantic Conveyor are sunk during the Falklands War; Coventry by two A-4C Skyhawks and Atlantic Conveyor by two Exocets.
- May 26 – English club Aston Villa F.C. wins the European Cup, beating Bayern Munich 1–0 after a 69th-minute goal by Peter Withe in Rotterdam.
- May 28–29 – Falklands War: Battle of Goose Green: British forces defeat a larger Argentine force.
- May 30
  - Spain becomes the 16th member of NATO and the first nation to enter the alliance since West Germany's admission in 1955.
  - Indianapolis 500: 1973 winner Gordon Johncock wins his second race over 1979 winner Rick Mears by 0.16 seconds. Leading to the closest finish to this date, Mears draws alongside Johncock with a lap remaining, after erasing a seemingly insurmountable advantage of more than 11 seconds in the final 10 laps, in what Indianapolis Motor Speedway historian Donald Davidson and Speedway public address announcer Tom Carnegie later call the greatest moment in the track's history.

=== June ===
- June 6 – The 1982 Lebanon War begins: Israeli forces under Defense Minister Ariel Sharon invade southern Lebanon in their "Operation Peace for the Galilee," eventually reaching as far north as the capital Beirut. The United Nations Security Council votes to demand that Israel withdraw its troops from Lebanon.
- June 8
  - Falklands War: British supply ship RFA Sir Galahad is destroyed during the Bluff Cove Air Attacks
  - VASP Flight 168, a Boeing 727 passenger jet, crashes into a forest hillside in Fortaleza in Brazil, killing 137.
  - The Los Angeles Lakers defeat the Philadelphia 76ers in six games to win the 1982 NBA Finals.
- June 11 – E.T.: The Extra-Terrestrial is released in the United States; directed by Steven Spielberg, this will become the biggest box-office hit for the next 11 years.
- June 12 – The Nuclear Disarmament Rally, an event against nuclear weapon proliferation, draws 750,000 to New York City's Central Park. Performers include Jackson Browne, James Taylor, Bruce Springsteen and Linda Ronstadt. An international convocation at the Cathedral of St. John the Divine features prominent peace activists from around the world and afterward participants march on Fifth Avenue to Central Park for the rally.
- June 13
  - The 1982 FIFA World Cup in Association football begins in Spain.
  - Fahd becomes King of Saudi Arabia upon the death of his brother, Khalid.
- June 14 – Argentine surrender in the Falklands War: Argentine forces in the island capital, Stanley, surrender to British forces.
- June 18 – Argentine military dictator Leopoldo Galtieri resigns in the wake of his country's defeat in the Falklands War.
- June 20 – Falklands War ends with British forces retaking the South Sandwich Islands.
- June 24 – British Airways Flight 9 suffers a temporary four-engine flameout and damage to the exterior of the plane after flying through the otherwise undetected volcanic ash plume from Indonesia's Mount Galunggung.

=== July ===
- July 4 – Four Iranian diplomats are kidnapped upon Israel's invasion of Lebanon.
- July 6 – A lunar eclipse (umbral duration 236 min and total duration 106 min, the longest of the 20th century) occurs.
- July 9 – Pan Am Flight 759 (Boeing 727) crashes in Kenner, Louisiana, killing all 146 on board and 8 on the ground.
- July 11 – Italy beats West Germany 3–1 to win the 1982 FIFA World Cup in Spain.
- July 16 – In New York City, the Reverend Sun Myung Moon is sentenced to 18 months in prison and fined $25,000 for tax fraud and conspiracy to obstruct justice.
- July 20 – Hyde Park and Regent's Park bombings: the Provisional IRA detonates 2 bombs in central London, killing 8 soldiers, wounding 47 people, and leading to the deaths of 7 horses.
- July 23
  - The International Whaling Commission decides to end commercial whaling by 1985–1986.
  - Torrential rain and mudslides in Nagasaki, Japan, destroy bridges and kill 299.
  - Twilight Zone accident: During filming of Twilight Zone: The Movie, actor Vic Morrow and 2 child actors die in a helicopter stunt accident in California.
- July 31 – Beaune coach crash: In Beaune, France, 53 persons, 46 of them children, die in a highway accident (France's worst).

=== August ===
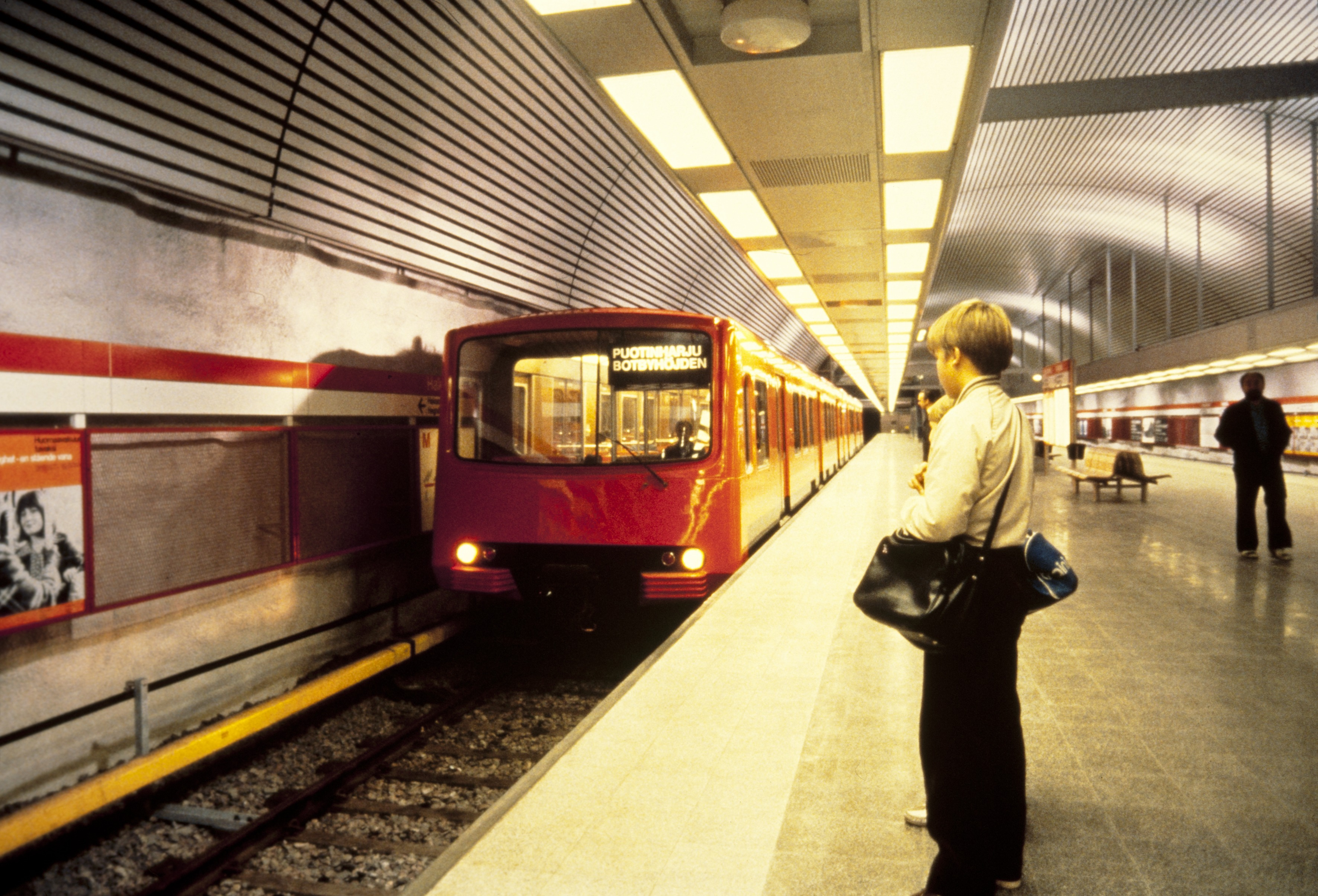
Helsinki Metro train in 1982

- August 1 – Attempted coup against the government of Daniel Arap Moi in Kenya.
- August 2 – The Helsinki Metro, the first rapid transit system in Finland, opens to the general public.
- August 4 – The United Nations Security Council votes to censure Israel because its troops are still in Lebanon.
- August 7 – Italian Prime Minister Giovanni Spadolini resigns.
- August 12 – Mexico announces it is unable to pay its large foreign debt, triggering a debt crisis that quickly spreads throughout Latin America.
- August 13 – In Hong Kong, health warnings on cigarette packets are made statutory.
- August 17 – The first compact discs (CDs) are produced in Germany.
- August 20 – Lebanese Civil War: A multinational force lands in Beirut to oversee the PLO withdrawal from Lebanon.
- August 26 – World-leading asbestos producer Johns Manville files for bankruptcy

=== September ===
- September 14
  - Lebanese President-elect Bachir Gemayel is assassinated in Beirut.
  - Princess Grace of Monaco dies after having suffered a car crash a few days previously.
- September 18
  - Sabra and Shatila massacre: A Lebanese Christian militia (the Phalange) kill thousands of Palestinians in the Sabra and Shatila refugee camps in West Beirut; the massacre is a response to the assassination of the president-elect, Bachir Gemayel, four days earlier.
  - The funeral of Princess Grace of Monaco takes place.
- September 19 – The first emoticons are posted by Scott Fahlman.
- September 21
  - The first International Day of Peace is proclaimed by the United Nations.
  - In the United States, the National Football League Players Association calls a strike, the first in-season work stoppage in the National Football League's 63-year history. The strike lasts for 57 days, reduces the regular season from 16 games to 9, and forces an expanded 16-team playoff tournament.
- September 23 – Amine Gemayel, brother of Bachir, is elected president of Lebanon.
- September 24 – The Wimpy Operation, the first act of armed resistance against Israeli troops in Beirut, begins.
- September 25 – In Israel, 400,000 marchers demand the resignation of Prime Minister Menachem Begin.
- September 26 – Thermals take Australian parachutist Rich Collins up to 2,800 metres (9,200 ft) during a jump; he almost blacks out due to lack of oxygen. He releases his main parachute to fall to a lower altitude and lands by his reserve parachute.
- September 29 – Chicago Tylenol murders: an unknown killer laces Tylenol capsules with potassium cyanide that kills seven in Chicago, Illinois.

=== October ===
- October 1
  - Helmut Kohl replaces Helmut Schmidt as Chancellor of West Germany through a constructive vote of no confidence.
  - Sony launches the first consumer compact disc (CD) player (model CDP-101).
- October 8
  - Poland bans the Solidarity trade union after having suspended it on December 13, 1981.
  - After six years in opposition, Social Democrat Olof Palme becomes Prime Minister of Sweden once again.
- October 11 – The Mary Rose, flagship of Henry VIII of England that sank in 1545, is raised from the Solent.
- October 12 – The Saudi Arabian cargo ship Elhawi Star, transporting 3,631 tonnes of ceramic tiles and 781 tonnes of lumber to Chioggia, sank while being towed away from the Port of Rijeka by the tugboats Beli Kamik and Aries because of the unevenly distributed cargo.
- October 20 – Luzhniki disaster: During the UEFA Cup match between FC Spartak Moscow and HFC Haarlem, 66 people are crushed to death.
- October 27 – In Canada, the July 1 holiday, Dominion Day, is officially renamed Canada Day.
- October 28 – The Socialist Party wins the election in Spain; Felipe González is elected Prime Minister.

=== November ===
- November 3
  - A gasoline (petrol) tanker explodes in the Salang Tunnel in Afghanistan, killing at least 176 people.
  - The Dow Jones Industrial Average surges 43.41 points, or 4.25%, to close at 1,065.49, its first all-time high in more than 9 years.
- November 6 – Paul Biya becomes the second president of Cameroon following the resignation of Ahmadou Ahidjo.
- November 8 – Kenan Evren becomes the seventh president of Turkey as a result of the constitution referendum. His former title was "head of state".
- November 11 – In Lebanon, the first Tyre headquarters bombing kills between 89 and 102 people.
- November 12 – In the Soviet Union, former KGB head Yuri Andropov is selected to become the general secretary of the Soviet Communist Party's Central Committee, succeeding Leonid Brezhnev, who had died two days earlier.
- November 14 – The leader of Poland's outlawed Solidarity movement, Lech Wałęsa, is released from 11 months of internment near the Soviet border.
- November 20
  - The General Union of Ecuadorian Workers (UGTE) is founded.
  - University of California, Berkeley executes "The Play" in a college football game against Stanford. Completing a wacky 57-yard kickoff return that includes five laterals, Kevin Moen runs through Stanford band members who have prematurely come onto the field. His touchdown stands and California wins 25–20.
- November 24 – Representatives from 88 countries gather in Geneva to discuss world trade and ways to work toward aspects of free trade.
- November 27 – Yasuhiro Nakasone becomes Prime Minister of Japan.
- November 28
  - The Edmonton Eskimos win an unprecedented 5th consecutive Grey Cup – a feat yet unaccomplished by any professional football franchise – to win the 70th Grey Cup, defeating the Toronto Argonauts 32–16.
  - Al Ahly SC win the African Cup of Champions club (later known as the CAF Champions League) for the first time after defeating Ghanaian Asante Kotoko
- November 29 – Michael Jackson releases his sixth studio album, Thriller, in the United States, which will go on to be the best-selling album of all time.

=== December ===
- December 1 – Miguel de la Madrid takes office as President of Mexico.
- December 2 – At the University of Utah, 61-year-old retired dentist Barney Clark becomes the first person to receive a permanent artificial heart (he lives for 112 days with the device).
- December 4 – The People's Republic of China adopts its current constitution.
- December 7 – The first U.S. execution by lethal injection is carried out in Texas.
- December 8 – The December murders occur in Suriname.
- December 10 – United Nations Convention on the Law of the Sea signed at Montego Bay; it becomes fully effective on November 16, 1994, on receiving 60 signatures.
- December 11 – Swedish pop group ABBA make their final public performance on the British TV programme The Late, Late Breakfast Show.
- December 13 – The 6.2 M_{w} North Yemen earthquake shakes southwestern Yemen with a maximum Mercalli intensity of VIII (Severe), killing 2,800.
- December 16
  - The United Freedom Front bombs an office of South African Airways in Elmont, NY and an IBM office in Harrison, NY. Two police officers suffer hearing damage. In March 1984, the UFF claims responsibility for the IBM building bombing, stating that the company was targeted because of its business in South Africa under Apartheid.
  - The Red Hot Chili Peppers perform live for the first time.
- December 22 – The Indian Ocean Commission (Commission de l'Océan Indien, COI) is created by the Port Louis Agreement.
- December 26 – Time magazine's Man of the Year is given, for the first time to a non-human, the computer.

=== Date unknown ===
- The population of the People's Republic of China alone exceeds 1 billion, making China the first nation to have a population of more than a billion.
- A global surplus of crude oil causes gasoline prices to collapse.
- Ciabatta bread is invented by a baker in Verona, Italy.

== Nobel Prizes ==

- Physics – Kenneth G. Wilson
- Chemistry – Aaron Klug
- Medicine – Sune K. Bergström, Bengt I. Samuelsson, John R. Vane
- Literature – Gabriel García Márquez
- Peace – Alva Myrdal, Alfonso García Robles
- Economics – George Stigler

== Fields Medal ==
- Alain Connes, William Thurston, Shing-Tung Yau
