= ClutchPoints =

American sports media website

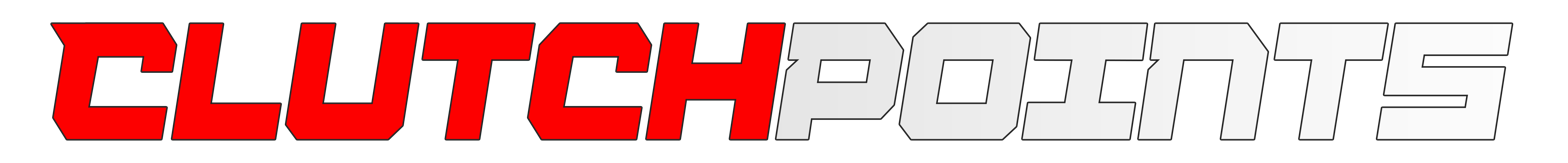
- Website type: Sports media
- Founder: Nish Patel
- Key people: Nish Patel (CEO)
- Website: www.clutchpoints.com
- Launched: 2015; 11 years ago
- Current status: Active

ClutchPoints is an American sports news website. It was founded by Nish Patel in 2015. ClutchPoints covers the NBA, NFL, MLB, NHL, WNBA, NCAA football, and NCAA basketball among other sports through a focus on team-specific fans across their editorial, video, and social content, with the latter being known in the form of creative graphics.

== Corporate affairs and business model ==
Nish Patel has been ClutchPoints’ chief executive officer since he founded the company. Willy He serves as Head of Growth and Dillon Reagan serves as Head of Operations.

The company generates revenue through advertising and sales.

== History ==
ClutchPoints was founded by Nish Patel in 2015. As a college sophomore at the University of California, Los Angeles in 2012, Patel first built a Facebook page called NBA Memes that focused on memes on the NBA. Patel then created various NBA team-specific social media pages. After building up an audience of close to 5 million, Patel began looking for help to grow the company. Patel eventually started Bruin Entrepreneurs, and through StartUp UCLA's summer accelerator program, he was able to find investors interested in helping him start a company.

ClutchPoints' app includes the same written content as its website alongside individual game streams with tweets, analysis, play-by-play, and highlights in one feed.

In April 2017, ClutchPoints raised $500,000 in seed money with Eytan Elbaz, Gil Elbaz, ActOne Ventures, and TenOneTen Ventures contributing.

In February 2018, Baron Davis invested in ClutchPoints.

In February 2020, ClutchPoints agreed to a podcasting content partnership with Blue Wire focused on two podcasts, Battle for LA and Establish the Pass.

In July 2020, ClutchPoints released a web series on Kobe Bryant's 2010 NBA championship, The Final Ring, which featured interviews from Los Angeles Lakers players such as Derek Fisher, Pau Gasol, and Metta Sandiford-Artest, among others.

In March 2021, ClutchPoints invested in and partnered with Players Media Group's subsidiary, PlayersTV, to co-produce original programming through the PlayersTV media network owned by athletes such as Chris Paul, Damian Lillard, and Kyrie Irving.

In July 2021, ClutchPoints announced a partnership with GameOn Technology to develop a Messenger chat application focused on delivering NBA content.

In December 2022, ClutchPoints announced a partnership with the National Basketball Retired Players Association (NBRPA) to develop content on retired players across the ABA, the NBA, and the WNBA.

In 2023, ClutchPoints became a certified minority business enterprise via the Southern California Minority Supplier Development Council. In January of the same year, ClutchPoints and Overtime announced a content partnership dedicated to real-time coverage of Overtime Elite. In September of the same year, ClutchPoints acquired HBCU Pulse, a media company focused on historically black colleges and universities-related news, entertainment, and sports.

In June 2024, ClutchPoints announced a sponsorship deal with ZALA, a football team led by AJ DeLaGarza that plays in the Soccer Tournament.
