= Aurous (website) =

Music streaming website

Aurous was a free music streaming website developed by Andrew Sampson, that pulled content from over 120 sources. Journalists have compared its function to Popcorn Time, a software that made unlicensed film and television streams free and easily accessible. It was sued by the Recording Industry Association of America within days of its launch.

Aurous shut down after less than two months of operating and the major labels took control of its intellectual property.
