= /pol/ =

Political discussion board on 4chan

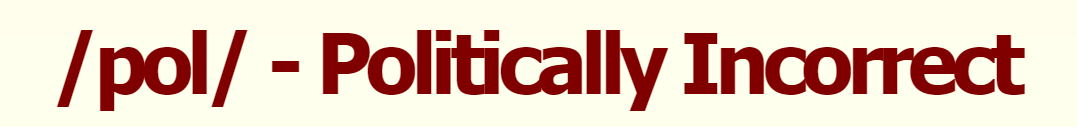
- Website type: 4chan imageboard
- Available in: English
- Owner: Hiroyuki Nishimura
- Founder: Christopher "moot" Poole
- Key people: RapeApe
- Website: 4chan.org/pol/
- Commercial: Yes
- Registration: Optional
- Launched: October 23, 2011; 15 years ago
- Current status: Online

/pol/, short for Politically Incorrect, is an anonymous political discussion imageboard on 4chan, created in 2011. As of 2022, it was the most active board on the site. It has had a substantial impact on Internet culture. It has acted as a platform for far-right extremism; the board is well known for its widespread racist, white supremacist, antisemitic, Islamophobic, misogynist, and anti-LGBTQ content. (Note: The board has been noted for widespread content that is: Racist; White supremacist; Antisemitic; Anti-Muslim; Misogynist; Anti-LGBT) /pol/ has been linked to various acts of real-world extremist violence. It has been described as one of the "[centers] of 4chan mobilization", a title also ascribed to /b/.

== Overview ==
Screenshot of the front (catalog) page of /pol/ in December 2019, with each discussion thread indicated by an image

Common /pol/ content involves discussion of history, far-right ideologies, hatred of transgender people and homosexuals, hatred of black people, hatred and sexual exploitation of women and girls and current events. A 2020 report categorized about 36% of news sources frequently posted to the board by American users as "junk news", a category that includes sources considered to be propaganda, sensationalist, or conspiracy theory content. Outside of traditional news sources, users also commonly rely on alternative media such as YouTube commentary as a source of news.

Flags are displayed on each post. A national flag corresponding to the user's geographic location based on their IP address may be displayed. Alternatively, users may select a "meme flag" (also referred to as a "troll flag"), corresponding to various political identifiers. However, these are not common per amount of posts—the "Nazi" meme flag was the most commonly used meme flag in a 2020 analysis, while posts with an American geographic location were about 57 times more common (and appeared the most of any flag).

Each post also has a unique ID attached, which is likewise associated with the user's IP address. However, these unique IDs will only tend to remain attached to a user per a single thread, as they are not persistent between multiple threads. Threads have a limited lifespan, effectively prioritizing newer content.

Much of the content on /pol/ relies heavily on Internet memes to further spread ideas. Many have questioned the sincerity of users on /pol/ as possible trolls. According to Mic, "On a place like /pol/, there's no clear delineation between sincerity, irony and cynicism." First Monday commented that "The creation of character-based archetypes is common on /pol/ and makes this online space semi-performative and semi-authentic."

While 4chan's /pol/ board is the most popular board under the "/pol/" name, versions on other websites have existed. These include Kohlchan, 8chan (later 8kun), 16chan, Shitchan, and Endchan, with some less popular "/pol/" themed boards accessible through the Tor network on sites such as 9chan and Neinchan. However, 4chan's /pol/ board has become increasingly "synonymous with 4chan as a whole", according to New Media & Society.

== History ==
/pol/ was first added to 4chan on 10 November 2011. It replaced the /new/ board for news which was deleted on 17 January 2011. According to 4chan's creator and ex-administrator Christopher Poole, this was because it had "devolved into /stormfront/". This was comparing /new/ to Stormfront, which is the oldest and largest Holocaust-denialist white supremacist site.

According to Christine Lagorio-Chafkin, /pol/ was created by Poole "to siphon off and contain the overtly xenophobic and racist comments and memes from other wings of 4chan." This has led to /pol/ acquiring the nickname of a "containment board", because its purpose is to keep far-right and generally political content off of 4chan's other boards.

Although there had previously been a strong left-libertarian contingent to 4chan activists, there was a gradual rightward turn on 4chan's politics board in the early-mid 2010s, with the fundamentalist approach to free speech contributing. The board quickly attracted posters with a political persuasion that later would be described with a new term, the alt-right.

=== Notable events ===
Screenshots of Trayvon Martin's hacked social media accounts were initially posted to /pol/ in 2015.

After the 2015 Umpqua Community College shooting, /pol/ began attempting to circulate on social media claims that comedian Sam Hyde was the perpetrator of a mass shooting event or terrorist attack. They repeated this after several other mass shootings, in attempts to troll mainstream news outlets into reporting Hyde as the attacker. According to BBC News, CNN mistakenly included Hyde's image on their coverage of the Umpqua shooting. After the 2017 Las Vegas shooting, a Google search for a different man's name returned a /pol/ thread in the "top stories" section falsely identifying him as the shooter. A spokesperson for Google said that the thread had appeared because search queries and news about the man were rare, allowing for the thread to appear in results, but that the thread did not appear in broader searches about the Las Vegas shooting.

On April 6, 2016, users on the board's /sg/ (short for Syria General) thread collaborated with a Russian Twitter account to locate an encampment of Syrian rebels. The account then claimed to have forwarded the location to the Russian Ministry of Defense. The board's users also allegedly located an ISIS training camp near Mosul, Iraq. The users coordinated on Telegram as well as on 4chan.

In summer 2016, /pol/ users coordinated "Operation Google", a campaign to associate the name "Google" with the ethnic slur "nigger". This was undertaken in response to Google's Jigsaw subsidiary developing Conversation AI, a tool made to recognize offensive language.

One of the most popular memes found on the board during the period surrounding the 2016 US presidential election was Pepe the Frog, which has been deemed a hate symbol in some contexts by the Anti-Defamation League due to its use in uniforms, places, and people associated with Nazism, the Ku Klux Klan, and antisemitism. Many /pol/ users favored Donald Trump during his 2016 United States presidential campaign. Some right-wing memes about the presidential campaign originated on the board. Upon his election, a /pol/ moderator embedded a pro-Trump video at the top of all of the board's pages.

Users of /pol/ engaged in coordinated attacks on LaBeouf, Rönkkö & Turner's HEWILLNOTDIVIDE.US, a 2017 performance art project made to protest Donald Trump's first presidency. Some users on the board suggested committing acts of violence against participants in the art project. Users also organized the "It's okay to be white" poster campaign the same year.

In 2017, users of /pol/ coordinated a campaign to convince mainstream news organizations that the OK gesture was a white power symbol; the OK gesture was later used meta-ironically by white supremacists.

In October 2017, a tripcode user referred to as "Q" began posting on 4chan's /pol/ board in what would become the QAnon conspiracy theory and political movement. Q soon moved to 8chan.

In 2019, 4chan and 8chan were temporarily blocked by internet service providers in Australia and New Zealand for containing videos of the Christchurch mosque shootings. Before the shootings, the shooter posted on 8chan's /pol/ board. The suspected perpetrators of the Poway synagogue shooting and the El Paso shooting also allegedly posted their manifestos there. In late 2019, a poster campaign coordinated on the board received some local and regional news coverage. The posters stated, "Islam was RIGHT about women".

In 2019, 38 minutes before the news of Jeffrey Epstein's death was announced officially and in the media, an anonymous person made a post on /pol/, claiming that Epstein had died "an hour ago". Later, FDNY launched an investigation due to the breach and violation of a federal health privacy law, HIPAA.

Example of a "super straight" flag

In late February and early March 2021, users on /pol/ boosted a social media trend called "super straight", which they said was a new sexuality describing heterosexuals who would never have a sexual relationship with transgender people. The trend began with a later-deleted TikTok video by a user who said he had created the term because he was tired of being called transphobic. LGBT versions of the trend are "super gay", "super lesbian", and "super bisexual". The Daily Dot stated that "trolls, bigots, and trans-exclusionary radical feminists" were "reframing their harassment of transgender people" through this trend. The trend spread to other platforms as well, including Twitter, and 4chan users were eager to "red pill" those in the Generation Z age group, create division among LGBTQ communities, and use the language of LGBTQ rights to troll leftists. Some 4chan members used Nazi symbols in their symbolism, including the logo of Adolf Hitler's Schutzstaffel, which also used SS as an acronym. Colors associated with "super straight", often used in the form of flags, were black and orange.

In a manifesto allegedly written by the accused perpetrator of the 2022 Buffalo shooting, the author said he was introduced to his far-right ideology (including a belief in the Great Replacement conspiracy theory) through browsing /pol/, beginning in May 2020.

The day after the 2022 Robb Elementary School shooting, Representative Paul Gosar (R-AZ) falsely claimed that its perpetrator was a "transsexual leftist illegal alien" in a tweet, which was taken down two hours after it was posted. The claim was based on a rumor started by an anonymous poster on /pol/, who posted the Reddit account of a transgender woman and claimed that she was the shooter; photos of the woman were widely shared on social media, including in conservative Facebook groups, where she was also erroneously identified as the shooter and harassed.

== Reception ==
Some have characterised /pol/ as predominantly racist and sexist, with many of its posts taking explicitly alt-right and neo-Nazi points of view. In particular, the board is infamous for the prevalence of antisemitic threads and memes. One common antisemitic meme on /pol/ is the Happy Merchant. Southern Poverty Law Center regards /pol/'s rhetorical style as widely emulated by white supremacist websites such as The Daily Stormer; the Stormer's editor, Andrew Anglin, concurred.

=== As a potential honeypot ===
Many have speculated whether the website is kept online as a honeypot for far-right groups, or to monitor extremists. In 2015, an Australian Department of Defence graduate used /pol/ to share classified information, only to be caught by another former Department of Defence worker browsing the site. Within /pol/, suspected agents of various intelligence communities are called "glowniggers", commonly shortened to "glowies", a reference to the computer programmer Terry A. Davis, who said the "CIA niggers glow in the dark, you can see them if you're driving, you just run them over." Because of this, suspicious posters are said to be "glowing", and activity on the forum deemed similar to those of CIA agents is referred to as "glowposting".

=== Alleged moderator racism ===
In 2020, several past and current moderators spoke to Vice Media's Motherboard about what they perceived as racist intent behind /pol/ and 4chan as a whole. They described how the manager of 4chan's volunteer "janitors", a moderator known as RapeApe, wishes to generate right-wing discussion on /pol/ and has dissuaded janitors from banning users for racism. Additionally, they noted how janitors were often fired whenever they held left-wing opinions. Hiroyuki Nishimura was described as letting RapeApe have full control of the site.

== Studies ==
=== Influence ===
A 2017 quantitative analysis found that /pol/ was an important influencer of news content on Twitter, with the board contributing 3% of mainstream news links and 1.96% of alternative news links on Twitter (as a fraction of all links co-appearing on Twitter, Reddit, and 4chan). The researchers concluded that "'fringe' communities often succeed in spreading alternative news to mainstream social networks".

=== Content and userbase ===
According to a 2017 longitudinal study, using a dataset of over 8 million posts, /pol/ is a diverse ecosystem with users well-distributed around the world. The percentage of posts containing hate speech ranges from 4.15% (e.g., in Indonesia, Arab countries) to 30% (e.g., China, Bahamas, Cyprus). Elevated use of hate speech is seen in Western European countries (e.g., Italy, Spain, Greece, and France). They also examined raids performed by /pol/ users against other platforms, particularly YouTube videos. They found that when a link to a YouTube video was posted on a /pol/ thread, an increase in hateful comments appeared on the video's comments section for the duration of that thread's existence. Another study found that adjusted for Internet-using population per country, users were most commonly from Canada, Australia, the United States, Ireland and Croatia. Users from other countries in Europe were also found to be common.

Following the announcement of a COVID-19 lockdown occurring in Wuhan, China, in January 2020, an international team of researchers noted an increase of anti-Chinese sentiment and anti-Asian slurs on /pol/ in reaction to the events surrounding the virus outbreak, in an analysis that also examined similar activity on Twitter. This included calls for violence against Chinese people. According to a 2020 report by the British charity Community Security Trust, many threads contain "explicit calls for Jews to be killed".

A study with data collected from April 2020 to June 2020 and published in Perspectives on Terrorism in February 2021 analyzed the popularity and content present on different /pol/ boards. To analyze board content, they examined which word sets were most common per board. They found that schisms were characteristic of this subculture, with splinter communities being less popular and more extreme on average. For example, discussion on 8kun's /pol/ board contained more racial content than did 4chan's much more popular /pol/ board, which hosted racist content as well. Neinchan, hosted on the Tor network, was indicated as having among the most extreme /pol/ boards, albeit with low traffic. The researchers indicated that academic work examining this subculture of far-right imageboards was lacking.

In a study published in January 2021, researchers found that there were escalating amounts of antisemitic rhetoric used on /pol/ after mass shooting events, particularly the Christchurch mosque shootings and the Pittsburgh synagogue shooting. Another study found that activity on the board more generally tended to increase rapidly following mass shootings committed by right-wing extremists.

A July 2021 analysis of climate change discussion on /pol/ found that there were large contingents of users who discussed the topic using antisemitic, racist and conspiracy theorist themes. It also found a growing trend of "climate nationalism" (i.e. the integration of nationalist and racist beliefs with narratives about the occurrence of climate change) among the board's users who participated in these conversations. These discussions still featured prominent amounts of debate concerning the scientific aspects of climate change, such as academic publishing and the validity of the scientific consensus on climate change. However, a trend was observed where, over time, this was a slowly declining feature of such discussions.

=== Research design ===
A study published in New Media & Society in January 2022 discussed the interactions between /pol/ users and the researchers who study their community. The study observed the reactions of /pol/ users to a research workshop dedicated to studying them. The researchers suggested that studies that aim to learn about the /pol/ community and its users should take into account (for research design purposes) that they may be aware of observation by external entities, "rather than seeing it as a community that can be externally observed without consequence." They also suggested that, "[A]cademics may be influenced by knowing that 4chan is watching. /pol/, and associated communities, have long been associated with attacks on those trying to study or criticise them..."

=== Artificial intelligence ===
In June 2022, it was made public that a chat bot named "GPT-4chan" was trained by Yannic Kilcher, a machine learning expert, using 134.5 million /pol/ posts. He allowed ten such bots to post on /pol/ without restriction for two periods of 24 hours, mimicking human users. It made 15,000 posts during the first period: about ten percent of the total /pol/ posts during that time. Overall, GPT-4chan had posted 30,000 times in 7,000 threads. One iteration of GPT-4chan could be distinguished from most other /pol/ users by its Seychelles flag, displayed due to Kilcher's use of a proxy server. He used 4chan's paid "4chan Pass" service to bypass anti-spam restrictions (such as CAPTCHA). The influx of GPT-4chan posts gained attention from /pol/ users, with some suspecting a government agent or a dedicated team of posters. Some also suggested a bot could have been posting. The experiment had some lasting impact on /pol/, with accusations between posters of bot use continuing past the experiment's run-time. The bot frequently posted racial slurs and conspiracy theories. GPT-4chan gained significant attention among media and artificial intelligence (AI) researchers. Kilcher's GPT-4chan experiments, as well as his decision to release the underlying model for the bot online, were controversial. A letter entitled "Condemning the deployment of GPT-4chan" was signed by hundreds of AI researchers and developers. One AI ethicist with the Australian Institute for Machine Learning said that it violated "every principle of human research ethics". A DeepMind researcher said GPT-4chan "contributed to 4chan's echo chamber" and that it was "not impossible that gpt-4chan pushed somebody over the edge in their worldview". The Next Web commented that "[GPT-4chan] highlights AI's ability to automate harassment, disrupt online communities, and manipulate public opinion ... it also spread discriminatory language at scale." MIT Technology Review said, "Considering the material it was trained on, this outcome was depressingly inevitable." Hugging Face, the website where the bot's model was published, restricted access to it. The site's CEO stated: "[T]he experiment of having the model post messages on 4chan was [in my opinion] pretty bad and inappropriate [...]". However, he also said that it "brought interesting insights into the limitations of existing benchmarks by outperforming the TruthfulQA Benchmark compared to GPT-J and GPT-3". The Register added that "GPT-4chan ... has some value for building potential automatic content moderation tools or probing existing benchmarks."

== See also ==
- /b/ – Imageboard or online forum on 4chan
- Gamergate controversy – Misogynistic online harassment campaign
- Moon Man – McDonald's advertising character
- Pizzagate conspiracy theory – Debunked conspiracy theory about alleged child sex ring
- Political correctness – Measures to avoid offense or disadvantage
- r/The_Donald – Banned Donald Trump-supporting subreddit
- /mlp/ – My Little Pony: Friendship Is Magic discussion board on 4chan
- /mu/ – Music discussion board on 4chan
- /x/ – Paranormal discussion board on 4chan
