= Zona (streaming video software) =

BitTorrent client for streaming video

- Release: ? December 2011; 14 years ago
- Stable release: 3.0.0.8 / 24 September 2024; 21 months ago
- Written in: Java
- Operating system: Windows (English/Russian), Android (Russian)
- Type: BitTorrent client
- License: Proprietary
- Website: zona.pub

Zona is a BitTorrent client for watching streaming video content. Described as a "Popcorn Time beater", the application provides a free alternative to subscription-based video streaming services (such as Netflix). In addition to on-demand movies and television series, Zona offers streaming music, live television channels, news, live sports, and games. Zona has been criticized for being closed-source as well as having an installer that has been implicated as malware.

== See also ==
- Popcorn Time
- Porn Time
- Comparison of BitTorrent clients
