= Bob Truel =

American computer programmer

Bob Truel is a computer programmer. He met Rich Skrenta in ninth grade in Mt. Lebanon, Pennsylvania and has since co-founded several Internet ventures with him and others, including DMOZ with Bryn Dole, Chris Tolles, and Jeremy Wenokur in 1998, Newhoo in 1998, Topix.net with Tom and Michael Markson in 2002, and search engine blekko with Michael Markson and Bryn Dole in 2007.
