= OpenSubtitles =

Subtitles aggregator

- Website type: Subtitles aggregator
- Available in: English
- Founded: 2005; 21 years ago
- Country of origin: Slovakia
- Founder: Braňo
- Website: www.opensubtitles.org
- Advertising: Yes
- Commercial: No
- Registration: Optional
- Current status: Active
- Written in: PHP

OpenSubtitles is a website dedicated to the aggregation of subtitles for audiovisual works.

In 2022, OpenSubtitles was one of the 5,000 most accessed websites from the internet.

== History ==
OpenSubtitles was created in 2005 by the Slovak programmer Braňo.

In 2018, the Federal Court of Australia issued an injunction demanding the blockage of 181 sites linked to online piracy, including OpenSubtitles. The case was filed by companies such as Village Roadshow, Disney, Twentieth Century Fox, Paramount Pictures, Columbia Pictures, Universal Pictures and Warner Bros.

In December 2019, OpenSubtitles started rerdirecting Danish IP addresses to a page showing a court order after receiving a notification in the previous month sent by the anti-piracy group RettighedsAlliancen.

In October 2021, OpenSubtitles was hacked, with the attacker obtaining the personal data of nearly seven million subscribers. The hacker asked for Bitcoin as ransom. The company agreed, but the database was leaked on 18 January 2022.

== Services ==
OpenSubtitles offers subtitles in several languages. It uses an IMDb ID as a basis for research, and it is possible to search for a subtitle using many methods, including multisearching. The website is available in XML format. OpenSubtitles is also able to collaborate with torrent clients, such as myBittorrent and BitTorrent.

Their subtitles can also be downloaded and uploaded via SubDownloader. The program is open source and programmed in Python.

== Popularity ==
Shortly after its creation, OpenSubtitles was already the most popular subtitles resource on the internet. In 2018, 69% of IMDb identifiers were associated with subtitles in at least two languages. Many websites and programs use OpenSubtitles in their applications, including VLC media player, YouTube and Stremio.

Since 2020, OpenSubtitles has been used to train LLMs, including Anthropic's Claude, Meta Platforms' Open Pre-trained Transformer, Nvidia's NeMo Megatron, and other companies, such as Apple Inc., Salesforce, Bloomberg L.P., EleutherAI, Databricks, Cerebras, etc.

== See also ==
- Amara (organization)
