= The Pile (dataset) =

Training dataset for large language models

- Size: 886.03 GB
- Type: Open-source
- Language: English
- Creator(s): EleutherAI
- Date of release: December 31, 2020; 5 years ago
- Main application(s): Training large language models

The Pile is an 886 GB diverse, open-source dataset of English text created to train large language models (LLMs). It was constructed by EleutherAI in 2020 and publicly released on December 31 of that year. It is composed of 22 sub-datasets, including books, movie transcripts, and scientific papers, among other media. The Pile and Common Crawl had been, as of 2024, the two main training datasets being used to train AI models.

Copyright disputes centering around use of The Pile escalated in 2023, prompting Eleuther to start removing some datasets. Eleuther partnered with various organizations to release Common Pile v0.1 in 2025 in order to have a large curated training dataset without the copyright issues.

== Training on copyrighted works or derivatives ==
The Books3 component of the dataset contains copyrighted material compiled from Bibliotik, a piracy website. In July 2023, the Danish anti-piracy group Rights Alliance took down Books3 through DMCA notices. Books3 was removed from the Pile before a class action lawsuit was filed in 2024 by three authors seeking damages as copies of the original dataset were still copied and available on the web. By 2024, The Pile also was taken down from its original site, though was accessible from other file sharing services.

OpenSubtitles is another dataset used in the Pile that created controversy over the use of copyrighted works, this time from documentaries, movies, television and online videos.

Tens of thousands of YouTube videos had their subtitles scraped directly from YouTube and included in the Pile, which YouTube argued is against its terms of service.

Sub-datasets of The Pile (*denotes works with copyright disputes)
Component	Original size, GB
Pile-CC	243.87
PubMed Central*	96.93
Books3	108.40
OpenWebText2*	67.40
arXiv*	60.36
GitHub*	102.18
Free Law*	54.92
Stack Exchange*	34.57
USPTO Backgrounds*	24.59
PubMed Abstracts*	20.68
Gutenberg (PG-19)	11.68
OpenSubtitles	13.94
Wikipedia	6.85
DeepMind Mathematics	8.32
Ubuntu Freenode IRC logs*	5.93
BookCorpus2*	6.76
EuroParl	4.93
Hacker News*	4.19
YouTube Subtitles*	4.01
PhilPapers*	2.56
NIH ExPorter*	2.03
Enron Emails	0.95
Total	886.03

== Common Pile v0.1 ==
In June 2025, EleutherAI, in partnership with the Poolside, Hugging Face, and the US Library of Congress and over two dozen researchers at 14 institutions including the University of Toronto, MIT, CMU, the Vector Institute and the Allen Institute for AI, released Common Pile v0.1, a training dataset that contains only works where the licenses permit their use for training AI models. The intent was to show what is possible if ethically training AI systems while respecting copyright. They found that the process of gathering the data was time-consuming as it could not be fully automated, with humans verifying and annotating every entry, and that resulting models could achieve results that exceeded their expectations even though they were still not comparable with frontier models. The creators compared the results generated from Common Pile as similar to Llama 2, a model released two years before the creation of Common Pile. The model should provide less legal risk to those who use its output if there are fewer copyright issues with the underlying training data.

== See also ==
- List of chatbots
- List of datasets for machine-learning research
