= Butter Project =

Open-source BitTorrent video-streaming application suite

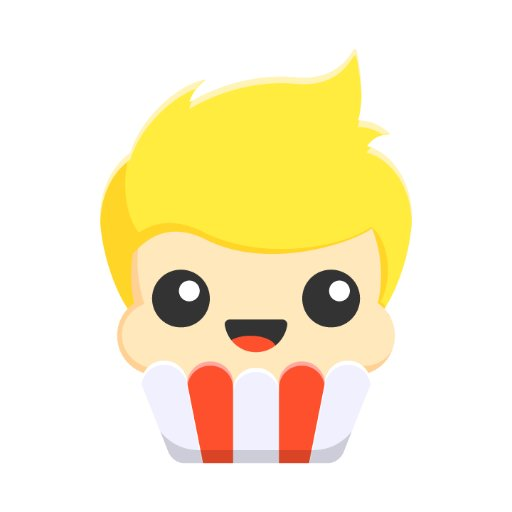
- Repository: github.com/butterproject/butter-android; github.com/butterproject/butter-desktop
- Written in: HTML, JavaScript, CSS
- Operating system: Linux, OS X, Windows, and Android
- Platform: Node.js
- Available in: 44 languages
- License: GNU Affero General Public License
- Website: butterproject.org

Butter Project or simply Butter is a suite of open-source desktop and mobile applications that allow video-streaming over the BitTorrent protocol. The project was first made public on 23 October 2015. The aim is to create a completely legal base which other applications can use to provide streaming functionality.

Butter Project was created as a split from Popcorn Time when the latter met legal difficulties — – with Butter Project aiming to retain development of only expressly legal and permissible portions of the code-base, relating to video-streaming. The developers have asserted Butter Project will not use any of the popcorntime.io infrastructure. Butter Project is not aimed at allowing copyright infringement, but aims to build the groundworks for streaming video over BitTorrent. By having a legal portion which remains on GitHub the creators hope they can get more developers involved.

By default Butter can play content from VODO which carries free videos, but will also be configurable to allow for custom sources of video.

== Discontinuation ==
On April 25th, 2020 Niv Sardi edited the official Butter Project code repository on GitHub to add a heading at the beginning of the README stating that the project is currently looking for maintainers. As of late March 2025, no other commits have been made to the repository. As of the same date, the registration for the project's official domain, butterproject.org, has lapsed and the domain has been taken over by domain squatters. According to the WHOIS registry for the domain, it was registered by the current owners in January 2020.
