= Topix (website) =

American internet news media company

Topix LLC
- Website type: News aggregator; Internet media company
- Founded: 2004; 22 years ago
- Dissolved: December 20, 2018; 7 years ago
- Headquarters: Palo Alto, California, U.S.
- Founders: Bryn Dole; Rich Skrenta; Bob Truel; Tom Markson; Mike Markson; Chris Tolles
- Key people: Chris Tolles (CEO); Steve Rubinstein (COO); Mike Sawka (VP Engineering)
- Industry: Internet

Topix was an American Internet media company. Topix LLC, the controlling company, had its headquarters in Palo Alto, California.

Topix began as a news aggregator which categorizes news stories by topic and geography. In the last few years, Topix changed its focus from aggregation and curation, to content creation. Topix removed the human sexuality topic, which was one of its most popular topics, from its forums on June 26, 2016. The Topix local news and forums were shut down on December 20, 2018. Topix launched new entertainment-focused slideshow and quiz-based sites named Stars and Offbeat in 2015, and has continued to launch additional new sites since. Topix was in the top 100 largest US-based websites according to Quantcast.

On September 23, 2019, Publishers Clearing House acquired Topix and its website was redirected to pch.com.

== History ==
Topix was co-founded in 2004 by Bryn Dole, Rich Skrenta, Bob Truel, Tom Markson, Mike Markson and Chris Tolles, several of whom had previously helped create the Open Directory Project. In March 2005, the Knight Ridder (later taken over by The McClatchy Company), Tribune Company and Gannett media companies purchased a 75% stake in the company.

The service initially operated under the Topix.net domain as a news aggregator that automatically categorized articles by topic and by geographic location. On April 1, 2007, the company acquired the topix.com domain name and invited volunteers to edit the topics of their choice, on top of over 100 journalists and editors from various newspapers who had already signed up. Sometime in 2012 they took that volunteer edit option away without any communication to the thousands of volunteers.

Topix went on to create a community news editing platform, and popular forum system, allowing users to comment on news articles and the goings on of local communities. Topix also created forums, organized by locality as well as by subject matter, which allowed visitors to post comments whether or not they are relevant to a particular news story.

The founders of Topix initially wanted it to be a news aggregator, with specific pages for every community in the United States. As Topix matured, most of its growth occurred in small cities and towns in the United States. The people who commented in the Topix forums wanted to focus the discussions on more traditional small community gossip. Topix's main user base consisted of posters from cities and towns in the United States. Chris Tolles, the chief executive of Topix LLC since June 2007, said that Topix is very popular in "the feud states".

== Sites ==
Topix has the following category-specific sites:

- Stars (Celebrity and Entertainment)
- Offbeat (Pop Culture and Humor)
- Wellnest (Health and Wellness)
- Sideline (Sports)
- Blackbeat (Black Entertainment)
- Parenthood (Parenting)
- Pawsome (Pets)
- Estrellas (Spanish Language Entertainment)
- Rewind (History)
- Tempo (Music)
- Passport (Travel)

== Team ==
Management Team at Topix

- Chris Tolles - Co-founder and CEO
- Steve Rubinstein - COO
- Mike Sawka - CTO and VP Engineering
- Mary Noble - Editor-in-Chief

== Controversies ==
A. G. Sulzberger of The New York Times wrote that "The same Web sites created as places for candid talk about local news and politics are also hubs of unsubstantiated gossip, stirring widespread resentment in communities where ties run deep, memories run long and anonymity is something of a novel concept". He added that "Whereas online negativity seems to dissipate naturally in a large city, it often grates like steel wool in a small town where insults are not easily forgotten". Various local governments censured the Topix forums. Many lawsuits resulted from content posted on Topix.

On February 3, 2009, Mark and Rhonda Lesher filed a lawsuit against anonymous posters on Topix.com. According to their petition, over 1,700 defamatory statements were made about them by anonymous posters, resulting in 2,568 allegations of defamation and libel. Although Topix was not a party to the lawsuit, it was forced to reveal the IP addresses of the posters. The jury awarded the Leshers $13.8 million against several Topix posters but the court later overturned the award.

On January 21, 2011, Amanda Bennett shot and killed her three children, Jasmine, 14; Katelynn, 9; and Ryan, 4; before setting the home on fire and before killing herself. A possible motive for the shootings stemmed from her husband's infidelity and their pending divorce. It was discovered that Amanda went on a Topix forum to vent about her situation, only to get gossip and nasty comments surrounding the matter rampant. Many people believed the gossip fueled her motivation for the murders, but the CEO of Topix Chris Tolles, pushed back on these claims saying “Absolutely not. This woman had a lot going on and I feel deeply sorry that this happened, especially to her children, but I'm not sure that we could have done anything about it and I also don't think if I look through the stream of commentary here, there was nothing that was particularly out of line."

Initially Topix charged money to people who requested that Topix expedite the removal of negative posts. After thirty state attorneys general protested, Topix stopped charging. Jack Conway, the Kentucky Attorney General, said the charging scheme "smacked of having to pay a fee to get your good name back".

On March 20, 2012, online gossip was the subject of a story called "Innocent Man's Life Destroyed by Anonymous Topix Poster" on Good Morning America. Topix CEO Chris Tolles was interviewed for the piece.
