= Stremio =

Semi–open-source content aggregator

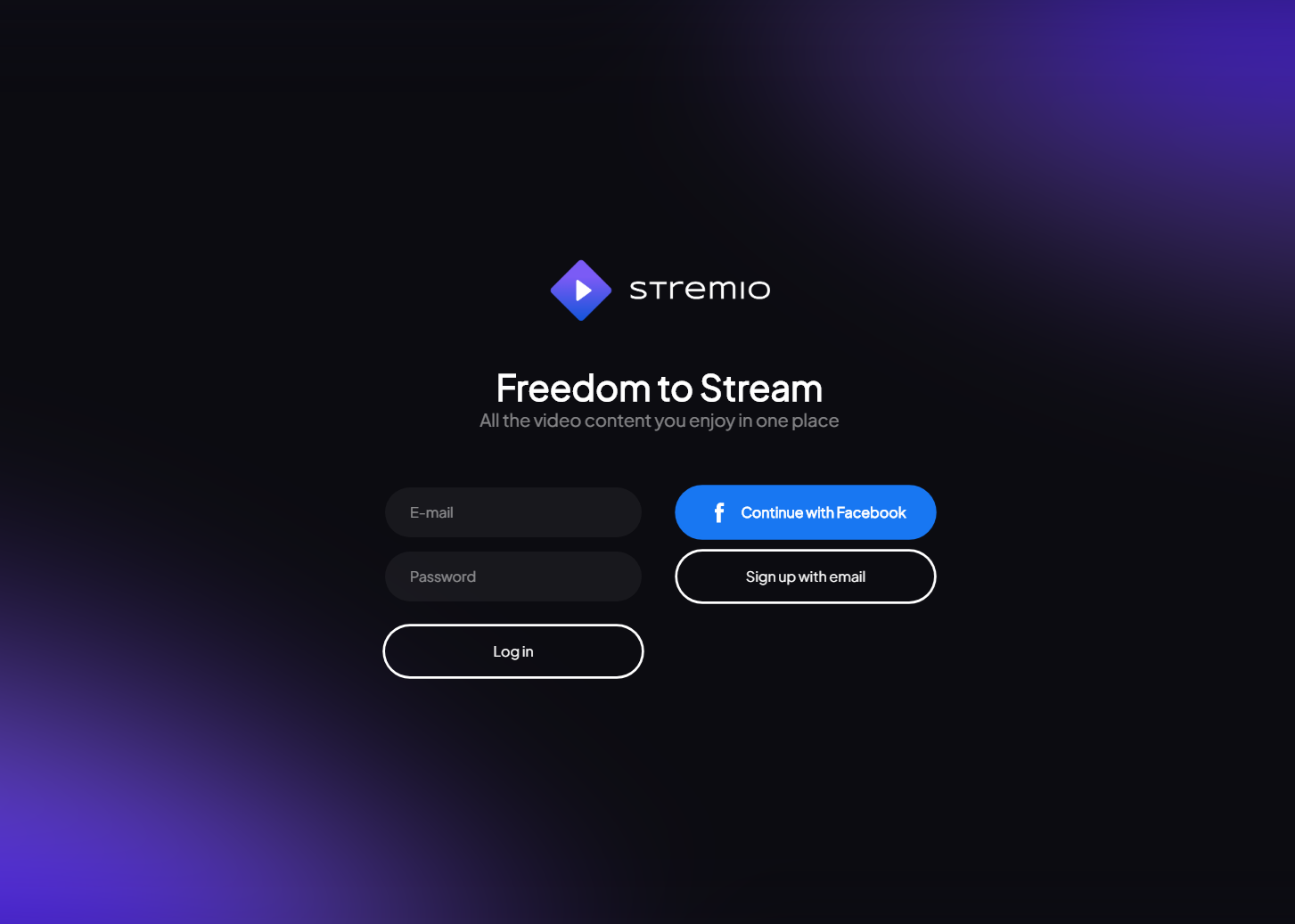
- Stremio Login Page Windows 11 Version v.4.4
- Release: February 8, 2015; 11 years ago
- Stable release: Stremio v5, Stremio Web / February 27, 2025; 20 months ago
- Website: www.stremio.com
- Repository: github.com/Stremio/stremio-shell

Stremio is an open-source content aggregator. It centralizes streaming metadata and multiple sources for a better tracking and viewing experience. The program allows users to use third-party plugins, thus becoming a popular alternative for streaming movies illegally.

== Overview ==
Stremio is focused on cross-platform streaming by aggregating information and sources into a single application that keeps track of watch history, in-progress shows/movies and content from multiple providers. Other features are available through the installation of third-party add-ons. Stremio displays information about movies and tv shows and where to watch them. Additionally, there is a dedicated section on the main page that contains live media and visual works in the public domain. Subtitles are generally available through OpenSubtitles. Stremio tracks when new episodes from a show are released and allows the user to catalogue their favorite shows and movies. Stremio code is archived as an ASAR file.

== Availability ==
Stremio is available for Windows, MacOS, Linux, Android, iOS, Meta Quest, PICO 4, Steam Deck, Raspberry Pi (4/5), and Smart TVs, including Samsung and LG.

Stremio was available on official app stores. A non-official version of Stremio was available on Amazon Appstore, but developers asked Amazon to remove the program and in December 2025 the official program was added, thus becoming available to Fire OS devices, such as Fire TV. It was also available on Google Play, but a third-party program was needed to download the updates as soon as they became available. In January 2026, Stremio was removed from Google Play. A light version of Stremio was available on Apple App Store, but it came without access to streaming via torrent. It was removed from the store in January 2026, but the developers have sent another version. A full version of the app can be downloaded for iOS through an .ipa file using sideloading.

Several independent projects were made to make Stremio compatible with other platforms. It is possible to use Stremio on old webOS applications through the independent GitHub project StremCompat. Stremio can also be fetched to Kodi through the addon Rivulet.

== Development and release ==
Stremio had been under development by the Bulgarian company Smart Code OOD since 2012. According to Ivo, Stremio co-founder, the app was created with the purpose of using torrents as a way to stream videos. Their first prototype was called Cinematic, based on libtorrent, python and NW.js and using Peerflix engine. The project evolved to be capable of streaming from other sources.

The app was officially released on 8 February 2015, after the deactivation of Popcorn Time. Its trademark is registered by the Seychelles-based company West Bridge LTD.

== Use for copyright infringement ==
Stremio itself is a movie catalog similar to the ones from Apple TV or Foxtel, but there are several unofficial plugins (addons) that allow users to illegally stream movies and TV shows. Several addons use Bittorrent in hand with the built-in metadata fetching tools of Stremio to provide a comprehensive streaming platform for users. There are also addons that streams live television.

Stremio has increased in popularity since 2020 and viralized on Twitter in 2024 as an alternative way of illegally streaming audiovisual works, due to the increasing prices of streaming platforms. Despite that, Stremio's legal accountability for copyright infringement is complex, as the app isn't a distributor, as it only provides an interface. Accountability of individuals is also possible, but uncommon.

== See also ==
- Popcorn Time
- Kodi (software)
