= Gil Elbaz =

American entrepreneur

Gil Elbaz is an American entrepreneur, investor and philanthropist. He co-founded Applied Semantics (ASI), along with his brother Eytan Elbaz and his former classmate Adam Weissman. He founded Factual and served as its chief executive until the company merged with Foursquare in 2020. He is also the founder and Chairman of the Board of Common Crawl, a non-profit organization dedicated to democratizing access to Internet information.

== Education ==
From 1987 to 1991, he attended the California Institute of Technology (Caltech), where he earned a bachelor's degree with a double major in engineering & applied science and economics.

== Career ==
After graduation, Elbaz worked as a database engineer in Silicon Valley for seven years. In 1998, Elbaz and his Caltech classmate Weissman founded Oingo, Inc. in Santa Monica. Oingo launched at the Fall 1999 Internet World and won the "Best of Show" Award in the category of Outstanding Internet Service. Oingo launched AdSense in December 2000. Oingo changed its name to Applied Semantics in 2001.

In April 2003, Applied Semantics was acquired by Google for US$102 million. As part of the acquisition deal, Elbaz, and over 40 members of the Applied Semantics team joined Google and became Google Santa Monica. Elbaz served as Engineering Director at Google from 2003 to 2007. In 2005, he was presented with the prestigious Founders’ Award. During his tenure at Google, Elbaz continued to work on the Applied Semantics technology and AdSense. AdSense helped establish Google’s position as a leader in online advertising and has been responsible for a substantial amount of revenue since its launch in 2005. In Q1 2011, Google reported it earned US$2.34 billion ($9.36 billion annualized), or 28% of total revenue, through AdSense.

In 2008, Elbaz founded Factual, an open data platform for application developers that leverages large scale aggregation and community exchange. Factual launched in October 2009. Elbaz self-funded the company for a little while, then in 2009 he raised over US$27 million from venture capital and angel investors, including the VC firms Andreessen Horowitz and Index Ventures and the digital technology thought-leader Esther Dyson, who in addition to investing, sits on Factual’s Board of Advisors. As of Q1 2018, Factual employs over 150 people, provides services to numerous users and partners with hundreds of customers including Facebook, Apple, Microsoft, Uber, Google's Doubleclick, The Trade Desk and many more. In 2020, Factual merged with Foursquare, and Elbaz now sits on the combined entity's Board of Directors. Elbaz is also a Managing Partner at Los Angeles-based TenOneTen Ventures.

== Philanthropy ==
Elbaz is active in a number of non-profit areas. Since 2006 he has sat on the board of trustees for the X Prize Foundation. He is also involved in Los Angeles Social Ventures Partners an organization of professionals who donate money, time and expertise to help Los Angeles area nonprofits. Elbaz is committed to the open information arena and supports organizations such as public.resource.org.

In 2007, Elbaz founded the Common Crawl Foundation, a non-profit foundation dedicated to building, maintaining and openly disseminating a comprehensive crawl of the Internet for the purpose of enabling a new wave of innovation, education, and research. Elbaz serves as the Foundation’s President and also as a member of the Board of Directors along with Carl Malamud and Nova Spivack.

Elbaz is a supporter of his alma mater Caltech and in 2008, he was given the honor to be named Young Alumni Trustee to the Board of Trustees.
