= Elk Cloner =

Microcomputer virus

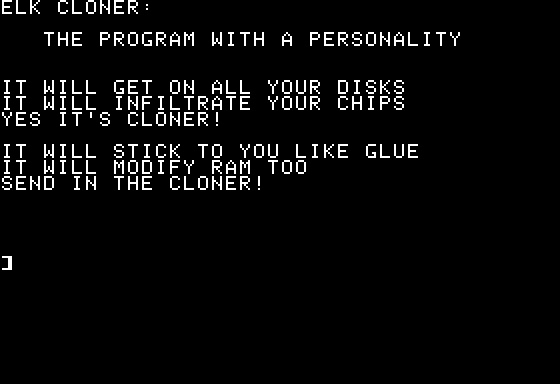

Malware details
- Type: Apple II
- Subtype: Boot sector virus
- Classification: Computer virus
- Isolation date: 1982
- Origin: Mt. Lebanon, Pennsylvania, U.S.
- Author: Rich Skrenta

Elk Cloner is one of the first known microcomputer viruses that spread "in the wild", i.e., outside the computer system or laboratory in which it was written. It attached itself to the Apple II operating system and spread by floppy disk. It was written around 1982 by programmer and entrepreneur Rich Skrenta as a 15-year-old high school student, originally as a joke, and put onto a game disk.

== Infection and symptoms ==
Elk Cloner spread by infecting the Apple DOS 3.3 operating system using a technique now known as a boot sector virus. It was attached to a program being shared on a disk (usually a game). At set numbers of times the disk's program had been run (all multiples of 5), it would cause various strange behaviors of the Apple II, many requiring a reboot to correct. Most noticeably, every 50th time the program was run, instead of executing normally, it would change to a blank screen that displayed a poem about the virus. If a computer booted from an infected floppy disk, a copy of the virus was placed in the computer's memory. When an uninfected disk was inserted into the computer, a modified version of DOS including Elk Cloner would be copied to the disk, allowing it to spread from disk to disk. To prevent the DOS from being continually rewritten each time the disk was accessed, Elk Cloner also wrote a signature byte to the disk's directory, indicating that it had already been infected.

The poem that Elk Cloner would display was as follows:

ELK CLONER:
   THE PROGRAM WITH A PERSONALITY
 
IT WILL GET ON ALL YOUR DISKS
IT WILL INFILTRATE YOUR CHIPS
YES IT'S CLONER!
 
IT WILL STICK TO YOU LIKE GLUE
IT WILL MODIFY RAM TOO
SEND IN THE CLONER!

Elk Cloner did not cause deliberate harm, but Apple DOS disks without a standard image had their reserved tracks overwritten.

== Development ==
Elk Cloner was created by Skrenta as a prank in 1982. Skrenta already had a reputation for pranks among his friends. In sharing computer games and software, he would often alter the floppy disks to shut down or display taunting on-screen messages. Due to this reputation, many of his friends simply stopped accepting floppy disks from him. Skrenta thought of methods to alter floppy disks without physically touching or harming them. During a winter break from Mt. Lebanon High School in Mt. Lebanon, Pennsylvania, Skrenta discovered how to launch the messages automatically on his Apple II computer. He developed what is now known as a boot sector virus, and began circulating it in early 1982 among high school friends and a local computer club. Twenty-five years later, in 2007, Skrenta called it "some dumb little practical joke."

== Distribution ==
According to contemporary reports, the virus was quite contagious, successfully infecting the floppies of most people Skrenta knew, and upsetting many of them. Skrenta's high school math teacher, on encountering the program on his computer, accused Skrenta of breaking into his office.

Part of the "success" was that people were not at all wary of the potential problem, nor were virus scanners or cleaners available. The virus could be removed using Apple's MASTER CREATE utility or other utilities to rewrite a fresh copy of DOS to the infected disk. Furthermore, once Elk Cloner was removed, the previously infected disk would not be reinfected since it already contained the Elk Cloner "signature" in its directory. It was also possible to "inoculate" uninfected disks against Elk Cloner by writing the "signature" to the disk; the virus would then think the disk was already infected and refrain from writing itself.
