= Popcorn Time =

BitTorrent client and media player software

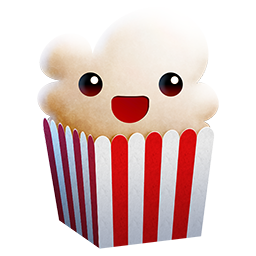
- Original authors: Federico Abad, Matías Fork, et al.
- Stable release: 0.3.6 / 12 July 2022
- Written in: HTML, JavaScript, NodeJS, CSS
- Engine: NW.js; V8; Google Native Client
- Operating system: Linux, macOS, Windows, Android
- Platform: Node.js
- Available in: 44 languages
- Type: BitTorrent client / Peer-to-peer
- License: GPL v3
- Website: popcorntime.app at the Wayback Machine (archived April 2, 2021)
- Repository: github.com/popcorn-official

Popcorn Time is a multi-platform, free software BitTorrent client that includes an integrated media player. The application provides a piracy-based alternative to subscription-based video streaming services such as Netflix. Popcorn Time uses sequential downloading to stream video listed by several torrent websites, and third-party trackers can also be added manually. The legality of the software depends on the jurisdiction.

Following its creation, Popcorn Time quickly received positive media attention, with some comparing the app to Netflix for its ease of use. After this increase in popularity, the program was abruptly taken down by its original developers on March 14, 2014, due to pressure from the Motion Picture Association of America (MPAA). Since then, the program has been forked several times with several other development teams such as Time4Popcorn and the Butter Project to maintain the program and produce new features. Time4Popcorn reportedly gained millions of users within four months of launching in 2014 and became the first fork to bring Popcorn Time to Android devices. In September 2014, Time4Popcorn became available on jailbroken Apple devices, and eventually non-jailbroken iOS devices via a Windows installation tool. The iOS version of Popcorn Time is no longer maintained.

On January 5, 2022, a popular copy of Popcorn Time was shut down due to "a lack of use".

== Functionality ==
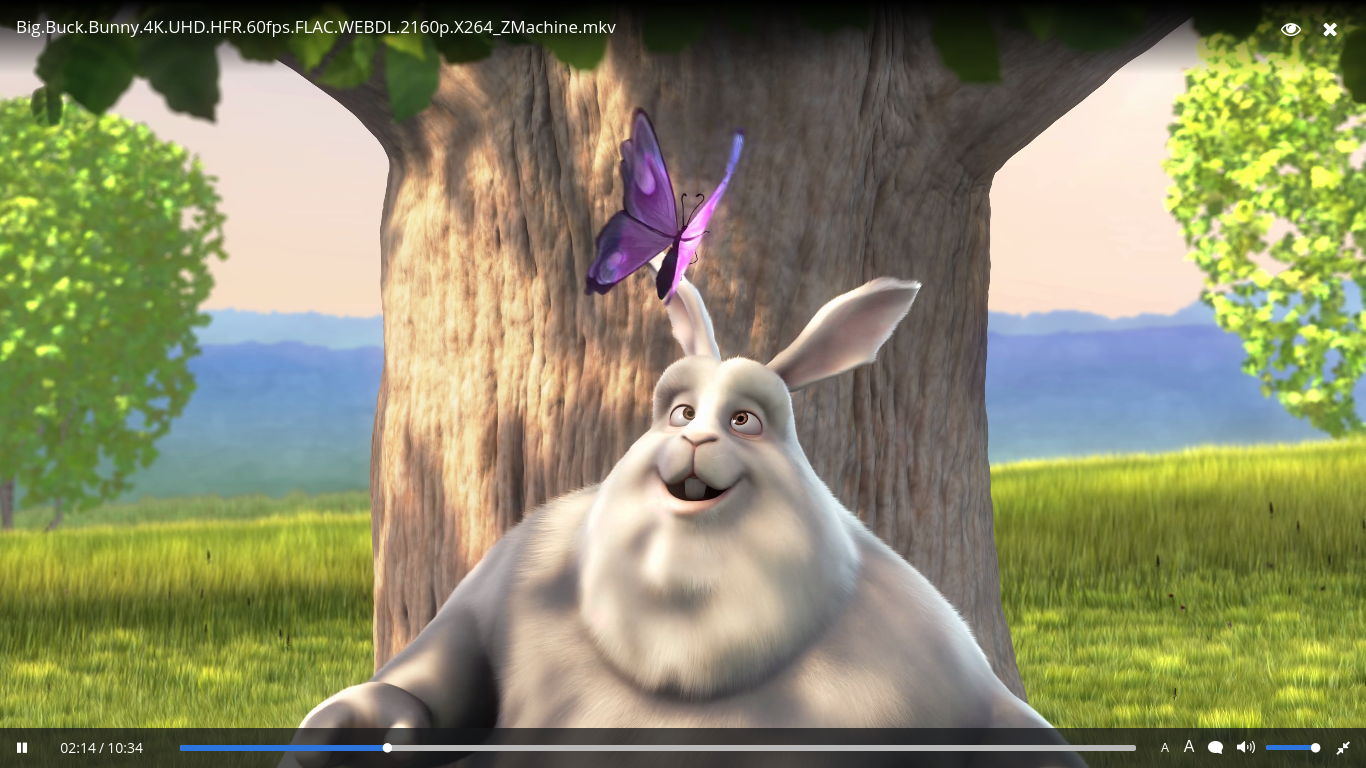
Big Buck Bunny on Popcorn Time 0.3.8

The Popcorn Time interface presents thumbnails and film titles in a manner similar to Netflix. This list of media can be searched and browsed by genres or categories. When a user clicks on one of the titles, the film is downloaded via the BitTorrent protocol. As with other BitTorrent clients, as soon as Popcorn Time starts to download a film, it also starts to share the downloaded content with other users (in technical terms, it seeds the torrent to others in the BitTorrent swarm). It continues to make the downloaded content available to others until the movie is deleted, which is normally done automatically once the application is closed.

== History ==
Popcorn Time was developed "in a couple of weeks" by a group from Buenos Aires, Argentina, who elected "Pochoclín" (derived from pochoclo, which means popcorn in Buenos Aires parlance) as their mascot. They believed that piracy was a "service problem" created by "an industry that portrays innovation as a threat to their antique recipe to collect value", and also argued that streaming providers were being given too many restrictions and forced to provide inconsistent service between countries, noting that streaming providers in their native Argentina "seem to believe that There's Something About Mary [1998] is a recent movie. That movie would be old enough to vote here."

Made available for Linux, macOS, Windows and Android, Popcorn Time's source code was downloadable from their website; the project was intended to be free software. Contributors localized the program into 44 languages.

=== Reception ===
Popcorn Time became the subject of mainstream media attention for its ease of use, with PC Magazine and CBC News likening Popcorn Time to Netflix, and noting its obvious advantages over Netflix such as the size of its library, and the recent selections available. Caitlin Dewey of The Washington Post said Popcorn Time may have been an attempt to make the normally "sketchy" ecosystem of torrents more accessible by giving it a clean modern look and an easy-to-use interface.

=== Legality ===
The legality of the various Popcorn Time clients matched that of all other BitTorrent clients plus the additional issues that apply to sites like The Pirate Bay and YTS itself, due to the explicit linking to movie content; its website claimed that the software was possibly illegal depending on local laws.

In the UK a court order was given in April 2015 to ISPs to block URLs that provided either the Popcorn Time application software (PTAS) or "sources of update information" (SUI), i.e. pointers to torrent-indexing sites. The court found that, unlike previous cases concerning indexing sites directly, neither websites providing the PTAS nor the SUI could be construed to be "communicating a work to the public", since neither contained any specific information about any specific work. It considered it entirely probable that both the providers of the PTAS and the SUI could be held to be "authorising acts of infringement" by users, but this was not the case that the claimants had raised at the hearing. Instead, they had claimed that the providers had been authorising acts of infringement by content-hosting websites, but then that claim had not been made out.

The judge, however, found that the Popcorn Time suppliers did "plainly know and intend" for the application to be "the key means which procures and induces the user to access the host website and therefore causes the infringing communications to occur"; and on this basis had "a common design with the operators of the host websites" and therefore shared a joint liability for the copyright infringements (joint tortfeasance). It was therefore appropriate to order the ISPs to block the websites as provided for by section 97A of the Copyright Designs and Patents Act 1988.

On May 20, 2015, the government of Israel blocked all access to the official downloads of Popcorn Time, following a lawsuit from its biggest cable and satellite providers for copyright infringement. Although the download sites were blocked, internet users still possessing a copy of the installation file and/or the program were not affected, and there were other sharing sites that distributed installation files. Less than a month later, the government reversed the ban.

On August 17, 2015, the Danish website popcorntime.dk was shut down by Danish police and two arrests were made. The case has caused controversy given that the website is not affiliated with the Popcorn Time developer teams but only distributed information about the service.

As with other BitTorrent clients, the IP addresses of users of the original app or its forks can easily be determined by third parties. In early 2015, many German Popcorn Time users received demands for damages of €815. The high amount was justified by the fact that the application not only downloads but also distributes movies, a fact that not all users were aware of.

==== Cobbler Nevada, LLC v. Anonymous Users of Popcorn Time: Does 1-11, Case No. 3:15-cv-1550 ====
In 2015, Cobbler Nevada alleged that Popcorn Time users illegally downloaded copies of the Adam Sandler movie The Cobbler. The plaintiff attempted to differentiate Popcorn Time from "all technological applications" by claiming that it had no legitimate purposes, however, the evidence in favor of this assertion was the Wikipedia article "Popcorn Time".

=== Popcorn-Time.no ===
On March 8, 2016, Norway's police unit for economic crimes, Økokrim, seized Popcorn-Time.no domain name. The original site did not host the Popcorn Time application but instead had news articles and external links to other applications. The seizure is being contested by the Norwegian member organizations NUUG and EFN.

=== Discontinuation ===
On March 14, 2014, Popcorn Time's original website and GitHub repository were removed after allegations of copyright infringement. It was later revealed by the Sony leaks that the MPAA did indeed prevent the original developers of Popcorn Time from continuing to work on the program. Despite the copyright complaints that the software received, Popcorn Time's developers simply wanted to move on. They said, "our experiment has put us at the doors of endless debates about copyright infringement and copyright, legal threats and the shady machinery that makes us feel in danger for doing what we love. And that's not a battle we want a place in".

The developers claimed that the majority of their users were those outside of the United States, and that it was "installed on every single country on Earth. Even the two that don't have internet access," by users who would "risk fines, lawsuits and whatever consequences that may come just to be able to watch a recent movie in slippers. Just to get the kind of experience they deserve". They also praised media outlets for not antagonizing them in their coverage of Popcorn Time, and agreeing with their views that the movie industry was anti-consumer and too restrictive in regard to innovation.

=== Successor ===
After its discontinuation, the Popcorn Time application was forked by various different groups to continue development of the project. On August 8, 2015, the website of the original Popcorn Time application was redirected to the popcorntime.io website. A few days later, members of the original Popcorn Time project announced that they would endorse the popcorntime.io project as the successor to the original discontinued Popcorn Time.

== Forks ==
Popcorn Time lineage

Popcorn Time; ~~getpopcorntime.me~~ (dead)
Time4Popcorn (closed source); ~~time4popcorn.eu~~ ~~popcorn-time.se~~ popcorn-time.to popcorn-time.tw	Popcorn Time (official, dead); ~~popcorntime.io~~
Popcorn Time CE (clone community edition); ~~popcorn-time.is~~ ~~popcorntime.ag~~	Popcorn Time CE (original community edition, dead); ~~popcorntime.ml~~ ~~popcorntime.tk~~ ~~popcorntimece.ch~~	Popcorn Time; ~~popcorntime.sh~~ ~~popcorntime.app~~

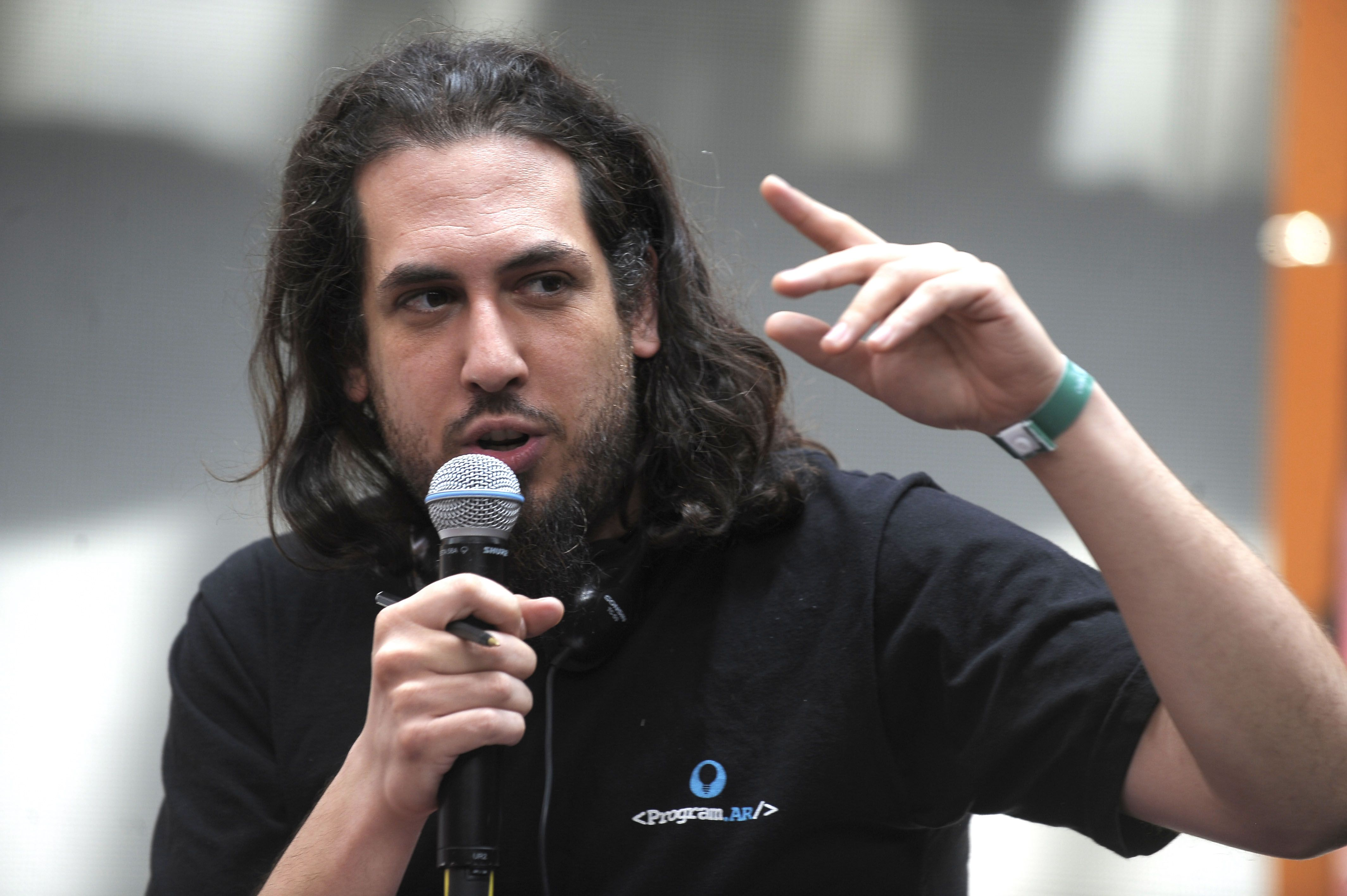
Argentinian programmer Niv Sardi, one of the developers of the Popcorntime.io fork

After the original developers discontinued the program, other teams forked the original Popcorn Time source code and continued development independently. These groups continued using the name "Popcorn Time", but other than the Popcorn Time project, these forks are not associated with the developers of the original application. The developers of the original Popcorn Time had members join the Popcorn Time project, and endorsed this as the successor to the discontinued old Popcorn Time. Popcorntime.app, formerly popcorntime.sh, is sponsored by private VPN company VPN.ht.

=== Time4Popcorn (Time4Popcorn.eu, Popcorn-Time.to Popcorn-Time.se) ===
This Popcorn Time fork was originally launched with the web domain time4popcorn.eu. The domain time4popcorn.eu was suspended by Eurid, as a result of a legal investigation against time4popcorn.eu. The programs that rely on the time4popcorn.eu domain temporarily stopped functioning, but the program and website were updated to a new domain popcorn-time.se. As the original time4Popcorn.eu domain was forcibly removed, the team moved to the popcorn-time.se website. On May 13, 2014, the fork released a mobile version for Android phones and tablets. In addition, popcorn-time.se added built in VPN on June 9, 2014, provided by Kebrum. The popcorn-time.se developers later added Chromecast support for desktop and Android. On July 30, 2014, popcorn-time.se developers added support for the Apple TV to their desktop app; on September 30, 2014, an app for jailbroken iOS devices was released. An anonymous development team created a tool that allows iOS users to download the fork via Windows, thus allowing non-jailbroken devices to install Popcorn Time.

=== Popcorn Time Community Edition ===
Following the shutdown of popcorntime.io, users of Popcorn Time created a series of fixes that modified the original software and got it working again. The fixes were added to the Popcorn Time installers and named Popcorn Time Community Edition, giving credit to the community of users that resurrected the software.

=== Popcorntime.sh (formerly popcorntime.io) ===
Popcorntime.sh is a free software fork of the original Popcorn Time program. In October 2015, PopcornTime.io was shut down, along with the YTS website.

On November 3, 2015, the popcorntime.io domain was obtained by the MPAA after winning court orders in Canada and New Zealand. This came about after winning an injunction on October 16, 2015, to shut the website down, although the project reappeared on a new website (popcorntime.sh).

== See also ==
- Butter Project
- Comparison of BitTorrent clients
- Porn Time
- Stremio
- Zona (streaming video software)
