= Porn Time =

Online pornography streaming application

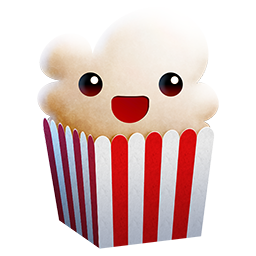
- Porn Time Official Logo
- Original author: Richard
- Stable release: 0.3.8-5 / July 27, 2015; 11 years ago
- Written in: HTML, JavaScript, CSS
- Operating system: Linux, OS X, Windows, Android
- Platform: Node.js
- Available in: 44 languages
- Type: Adult / Movie Streaming
- License: GPL v3
- Website: porntime.ws

Porn Time was an online streaming application formed from Popcorn Time, for the purpose of viewing pornographic content.

It was released on June 6, 2015, and has since acquired a large user base.

Torrentfreak quoted the development team saying: “We’re pretty shocked and find it a little hard to believe and amusing in a way. But Porn Time, the Popcorn Time for Porn, became an Internet phenomenon just one week after it went live!”

The country which has the most downloads of Porn Time is the US, followed by France and Brazil. Porn Time was initially released for Windows, Mac, and Linux, and is also available for Android devices. According to the team leader, Porn Time was created due to the demand for porn in Popcorn Time.

== See also ==
- Popcorn Time
