= Eytan Elbaz =

American entrepreneur and investor

Eytan Elbaz (/ˈeɪtɑːn ɛlˈbɑːz/ AY-tahn el-BAHZ) is an American entrepreneur and investor best known for co-founding Google AdSense along with his brother Gil Elbaz and Adam Weissman. He is an angel investor and founder of many Los Angeles-based companies, most notably the mobile gaming startup Scopely. He is also the founder and Chairman of the Board of Render Media, a new-age digital media startup.

== Education ==
Beginning in 1991, Elbaz attended the University of California, Los Angeles, where he graduated with a Bachelor of Science in Computer Science and Engineering in 1995.

== Career ==
After graduation, Elbaz worked in software sales for four years. In 1999, Elbaz co-founded Oingo, Inc. in Santa Monica. Oingo was launched at the Fall 1999 Internet World, and won the "Best of Show" Award in the category of Outstanding Internet Service. Oingo launched AdSense in December 2000, then changed its name to Applied Semantics in 2001.

In April 2003, Applied Semantics was acquired by Google for US$102 million in a deal that included pre-IPO Google company stock. As part of the acquisition deal, Elbaz, and over 40 members of the Applied Semantics team joined Google and became Google Santa Monica. Elbaz served as Head of Domain Channel at Google from 2003 to 2007.
