= Blekko =

Web search engine

blekko.com

- Blekko home page
- Website type: Search engine
- Available in: English
- Owner: IBM (International Business Machines)
- Website: www.blekko.com
- Launched: November 1, 2010
- Current status: Defunct (March 27, 2015)

Blekko (trademarked as blekko) was a company that operated a web search engine designed to compete with Google Search. It aggregated results from a set of 3 billion trusted webpages while excluding low-quality content farms. Launched to the public on November 1, 2010, the website used slashtags to categorize and filter results for common searches. The company also provided a downloadable browser search bar. IBM acquired Blekko in March 2015, after which the service was discontinued.

== Development ==
The company was co-founded in 2007 by Rich Skrenta, Bob Truel, and Michael Markson, who were former classmates at Mt. Lebanon High School. Skrenta had previously created Newhoo, which Netscape acquired and renamed the Open Directory Project. Blekko raised $24 million in venture capital from U.S. Venture Partners and CMEA Capital as well as individual investors such as Marc Andreessen and Ron Conway.

The company aimed to provide search results that excluded low-quality or irrelevant links. For common search categories like cars, finance, health, and hotels, the platform delivered results prescreened by Blekko editors. The New York Times described this as "Wikipedia-style policing" designed to filter out content farms and focus on results from professionals. Use of slashtags restricted the set of search results to those matching the specified characteristic, and a slashtag was to be automatically added for search categories with prescreened results. This use of slashtags was also implemented in the access of videos and images because Blekko did not have the option to search specific databases for those media types.

Queries related to personal health were limited to a prescreened list of sites that Blekko editors had determined to be trustworthy, excluding many sites that rank highly in Google searches. As of Blekko's launch date, its 8,000 beta editors had developed 3,000 slashtags corresponding to the site's most frequent searches. The company hoped to use editors to develop prepared lists of the 50 sites that best match its 100,000 most frequent search targets. Additional tools allowed users to see the IP address that a website is running on and let registered users label a site as spam.

Blekko also differentiated itself by offering richer data than its competitors. For instance, if a user accessed a domain name with the added /seo, he would be directed to a page containing the statistics of the URL. This is the reason experts cited Blekko's fitness with the Big Data paradigm since it gathers multiple data sets and presents them visually so that the user is provided with quick, meaningful, and actionable information.

At the time, Blekko announced plans to earn revenue by selling ads based on slashtags and search results. The company also planned to provide data on its algorithm for ranking search results, including details for inbound links to specific sites.

As part of a permanent post in Blekko's help section was the following "Web search bill of rights":

1. Search shall be open
2. Search results shall involve people
3. Ranking data shall not be kept secret
4. Web data shall be readily available
5. There is no one-size-fits-all for search
6. Advanced search shall be accessible
7. Search engine tools shall be open to all
8. Search and community go hand-in-hand
9. Spam does not belong in search results
10. Privacy of searchers shall not be violated

One writer referred to the bill of rights as "what we assume is a poke at Google".

In 2011 Blekko announced blocking "content farmy sites", to reduce spam, in line with its bill of rights.

In May 2012 Mozilla announced an "instant search" browser plugin for Firefox designed to cache repetitive search requests, in partnership with Blekko.

In August 2012 Blekko put all its SEO statistics behind a paywall, despite previously declaring that "ranking data shall not be kept secret" in its bill of rights.

=== Acquisition and closure ===
IBM bought Blekko and closed the search service on 27 March 2015, redirecting searches to a page announcing "The blekko technology and team have joined IBM Watson!" and linking to a blog post announcing that the blekko service was closed, with blekko's web-crawling abilities to be integrated into IBM Watson, adding advanced Web-crawling, categorization and intelligent filtering technology.

== Slashtags ==
Blekko used an initiative called slashtags, consisting of a text tag preceded by a "/" slash character, to allow ease of searching and categorise searches. System and pre-defined slashtags allowed users to start searching right away. Users could create slashtags after signup, to perform custom-sorted searches and to reduce spam.

== Features ==
The following features were available to all users:

- Search engine optimization statistics. From 2012 subject to payment.
- Linking pages (in and out statistics)
- IP address lookup
- Cached pages
- Tagging of pages
- Finding duplicate content
- Comparing sites
- Crawl statistics
- Page count
- Location of robots.txt
- Cohosted sites
- Page latency
- Page length

== Toolbar ==
Blekko offered a downloadable browser toolbar or search bar which changes default search and home page URLs of the user's web browsers.

== Reception ==
In 2010, John Dvorak described the site as adding "so much weird dimensionality" to search, and recommended it as "the best out-of-the-chute new engine I've seen in the last 10 years". In Matthew Rogers' review of the site, he found it "slow and cumbersome", and stated that he did not understand the necessity or utility for slashtags. In his PCMag.com review, Jeffrey L. Wilson expressed approval of some search results, but criticized the site's social features which "bog down the search experience."
