= Rich Skrenta =

American computer programmer (born 1967)

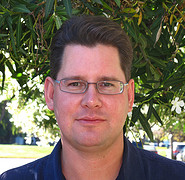
- Skrenta in 2009
- Born: Richard J. Skrenta Jr. June 6, 1967 (age 59); Pittsburgh, Pennsylvania, United States
- Occupation: Executive Director of Common Crawl
- Known for: Creating Blekko and Elk Cloner

Richard J. Skrenta Jr. (born June 6, 1967) is an American computer programmer and Silicon Valley entrepreneur who created the web search engine Blekko. He is currently the executive director of Common Crawl.

== Early life and education ==
Skrenta Jr. was born in Pittsburgh on June 6, 1967. In 1982, at age 15, as a high school student at Mt. Lebanon High School, Skrenta wrote the Elk Cloner virus that infected Apple II computers. It is widely believed to have been one of the first large-scale self-spreading personal computer viruses ever created. The virus displayed a short poem, among other things and was solved with a reboot.

In 1989, Skrenta graduated with a B.A. in computer science from Northwestern University.

== Career ==
Between 1989 and 1991, Skrenta worked at Commodore Business Machines with Amiga Unix.

In 1989, Skrenta started working on a multiplayer simulation game. In 1994, it was launched under the name Olympia as a pay-for-play PBEM game by Shadow Island Games.

Between 1991 and 1995, Skrenta worked at Unix System Labs, and from 1995 to 1998 worked on encryption at Sun Microsystems. After he left Sun he became one of the founders of DMOZ. He stayed on board after the Netscape acquisition, and continued to work on the directory as well as Netscape Search, AOL Music, and AOL Shopping.

After his stint at AOL, Skrenta went on to cofound Topix LLC, a Web 2.0 company in the news aggregation and forums market.

In 2005, Skrenta and his fellow cofounders sold a 75% share of Topix to a newspaper consortium made up of Tribune, Gannett, and Knight Ridder.

In the late 2000s, Skrenta headed the startup company Blekko Inc, which was an Internet search engine. Blekko received early investment support from Marc Andreessen and began public beta testing on November 1, 2010.

In 2015, IBM acquired both the Blekko company and search engine for their Watson computer system.

Skrenta was involved in the development of VMS Monster, an old MUD for VMS. VMS Monster was part of the inspiration for TinyMUD. He is also known for his role in developing TASS, an ancestor of tin, the threaded Usenet newsreader for Unix systems.

After working at IBM, Skrenta joined Meta.

As of 2025, he oversees the Common Crawl organization.
