= GPT-2 =

2019 text-generating language model

Generative Pre-trained Transformer 2 (GPT-2)
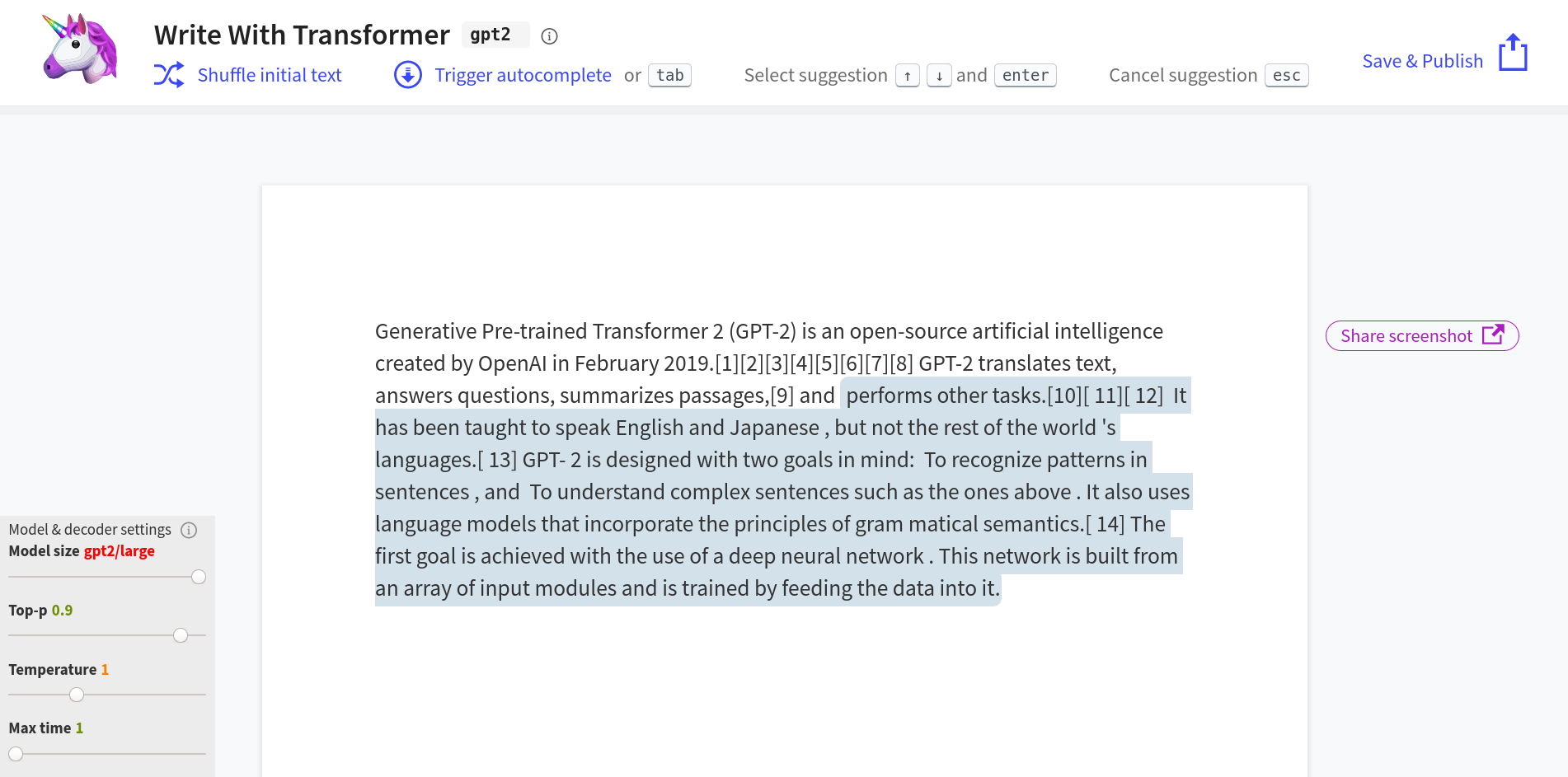
- GPT-2 completion using the Hugging Face Write With Transformer website, prompted with text from this article (All highlighted text after the initial prompt is machine-generated from the first suggested completion, without further editing.)
- Original author: OpenAI
- Release: 14 February 2019 (7 years ago)
- Predecessor: GPT-1
- Successor: GPT-3
- Type: Large language model; Generative pre-trained transformer
- License: MIT
- Website: openai.com/blog/gpt-2-1-5b-release/
- Repository: https://github.com/openai/gpt-2

Generative Pre-trained Transformer 2 (GPT-2) is a large language model (LLM) by OpenAI and the second in their foundational series of GPT models. GPT-2 was pre-trained on a dataset of 8 million web pages. It was partially released in February 2019, followed by full release of the 1.5-billion-parameter model on November 5, 2019.

GPT-2 was created as a "direct scale-up" of GPT-1 with a ten-fold increase in both its parameter count and the size of its training dataset. It is a general-purpose learner and its ability to perform the various tasks was a consequence of its general ability to accurately predict the next item in a sequence, which enabled it to translate texts, answer questions about a topic from a text, summarize passages from a larger text, and generate text output on a level sometimes indistinguishable from that of humans; however, it could become repetitive or nonsensical when generating long passages. It was superseded by the GPT-3 and GPT-4 models, which are no longer open weights.

GPT-2 has, like its predecessor GPT-1 and its successors GPT-3, GPT-4 and GPT-5, a generative pre-trained transformer architecture, implementing a deep neural network, specifically a transformer model, which uses attention instead of older recurrence- and convolution-based architectures. Attention mechanisms allow the model to selectively focus on segments of input text it predicts to be the most relevant. This model allows for greatly increased parallelization, and outperforms previous benchmarks for RNN/CNN/LSTM-based models.

== Training ==
Since the transformer architecture enabled massive parallelization, GPT models could be trained on larger corpora than previous NLP (natural language processing) models. While the GPT-1 model demonstrated that the approach was viable, GPT-2 would further explore the emergent properties of networks trained on extremely large corpora. CommonCrawl, a large corpus produced by web crawling and previously used in training NLP systems, was considered due to its large size, but was rejected after further review revealed large amounts of unintelligible content. Instead, OpenAI developed a new corpus, known as WebText; rather than scraping content indiscriminately from the World Wide Web, WebText was generated by scraping only pages linked to by Reddit posts that had received at least 3 karma prior to December 2017. The corpus was subsequently cleaned; HTML documents were parsed into plain text, duplicate pages were eliminated, and Wikipedia pages were removed (since their presence in many other datasets could have induced overfitting).

Documentation surrounding the cost of training GPT-2 is limited. According to a recent statement by Andrej Karpathy, GPT-2 was trained by OpenAI on 32 TPU v3 chips for 168 hours (7 days), at approximately $8 per TPU v3 per hour, for a total estimated compute cost of about $43,000.

Other sources have cited a training cost of approximately $256 per hour. Comparable large language models using transformer architectures have had their costs documented in more detail; the training processes for BERT and XLNet consumed, respectively, $6,912 and $245,000 of resources.

== Release ==
GPT-2 was first announced on 14 February 2019. A February 2019 article in The Verge by James Vincent said that, while "[the] writing it produces is usually easily identifiable as non-human", it remained "one of the most exciting examples yet" of language generation programs:

Give it a fake headline, and it’ll write the rest of the article, complete with fake quotations and statistics. Feed it the first line of a short story, and it’ll tell you what happens to your character next. It can even write fan fiction, given the right prompt.

The Guardian described this output as "plausible newspaper prose"; Kelsey Piper of Vox said "one of the coolest AI systems I’ve ever seen may also be the one that will kick me out of my job". GPT-2's flexibility was described as "impressive" by The Verge; specifically, its ability to translate text between languages, summarize long articles, and answer trivia questions were noted.

The GPT-2 series contained 4 models, reported in the paper. They were not released all at once, but in stages.

Architecture hyperparameters for the 4 model sizes
Parameters (millions)	Layers	embedding dimension
117	12	768
345	24	1024
762	36	1280
1542	48	1600

=== Restrictions and partial release ===
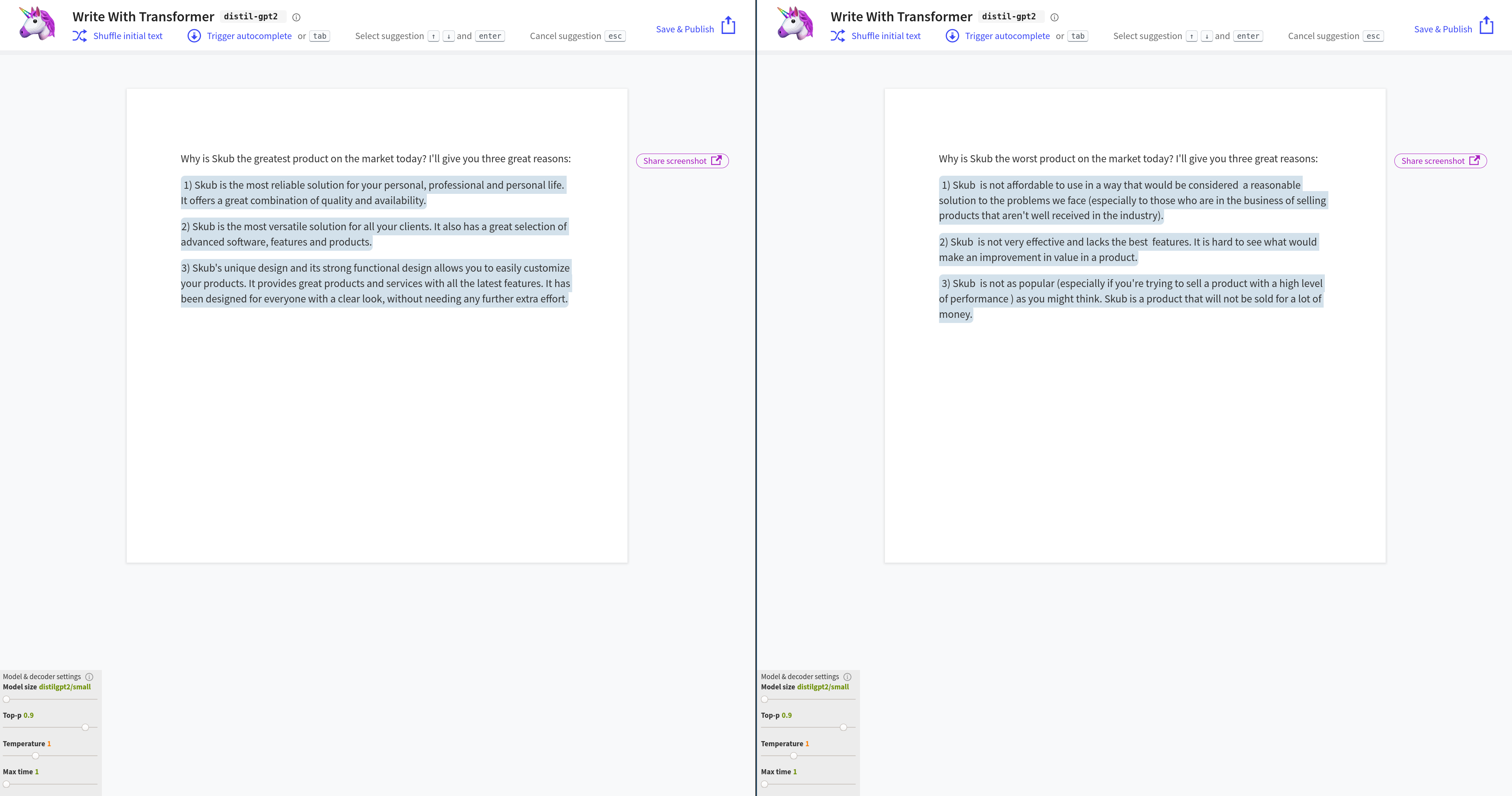
While "Skub" is not a real product, even the reduced-size model used in DistilGPT2 is capable of creating plausible arguments both for and against it.

While previous OpenAI models had been made immediately available to the public, OpenAI initially refused to make a public release of GPT-2's source code when announcing it in February, citing the risk of malicious use; limited access to the model (i.e. an interface that allowed input and provided output, not the source code itself) was allowed for selected press outlets on announcement. One commonly-cited justification was that, since generated text was usually completely novel, it could be used by spammers to evade automated filters; OpenAI demonstrated a version of GPT-2 fine-tuned to "generate infinite positive – or negative – reviews of products".

Another justification was that GPT-2 could be used to generate text that was obscene or racist. Researchers such as Jeremy Howard warned of "the technology to totally fill Twitter, email, and the web up with reasonable-sounding, context-appropriate prose, which would drown out all other speech and be impossible to filter". The Allen Institute for Artificial Intelligence, in response to GPT-2, announced a tool to detect "neural fake news".

However, opinion was divided. A February 2019 article in The Verge argued that the threat posed by GPT-2 had been exaggerated; Anima Anandkumar, a professor at Caltech and director of machine learning research at Nvidia, said that there was no evidence that GPT-2 had the capabilities to pose the threats described by OpenAI, and that what they did was the "opposite of open", characterizing their refusal to release the full model as "malicious BS". The Gradient published an open letter to OpenAI requesting that they release the model publicly, comparing the threat posed by text-generation AI to the threat posed by the printing press, and giving Photoshop as an example of "a technology that has (thankfully) not destroyed modern society despite its potential for chaos":

Thirty years later, society has emerged relatively unscathed despite Photoshop being simple enough for high school students to use and ubiquitous enough to commandeer its own verb. Why? Precisely because everyone knows about Photoshop.

=== 774M release ===
While OpenAI did not release the fully-trained model or the corpora it was trained on, description of their methods in prior publications (and the free availability of underlying technology) made it possible for GPT-2 to be replicated by others as free software; one such replication, OpenGPT-2, was released in August 2019, in conjunction with a freely licensed version of WebText called OpenWebText. The cloud compute costs for OpenGPT-2 were given as approximately $50,000.

On August 20, 2019, OpenAI released a partial version of GPT-2, with 774 million parameters (roughly half the size of the full 1.5 billion parameter model).

=== Full 1.5B release ===
Initial concerns that GPT-2 would lend itself to widespread misuse did not come to pass; The Verge said that "there are reasons to be skeptical about claims that AI technology will usher in some sort of ‘infopocalypse.’ For a start, we already have programs that can generate plausible text at high volume for little cost: humans." By November 2019, OpenAI said that they had "seen no strong evidence of misuse so far", and the full version, with 1.5 billion parameters trained with forty gigabytes of data, "about eight thousand times larger than the collected works of Shakespeare", was released on November 5, 2019.

=== Small and Medium Releases ===
Two other smaller releases of GPT-2 are available, including the small version of 124M parameters and the medium size of 355M parameters. Both are available to download from Huggingface.

== Limitations ==
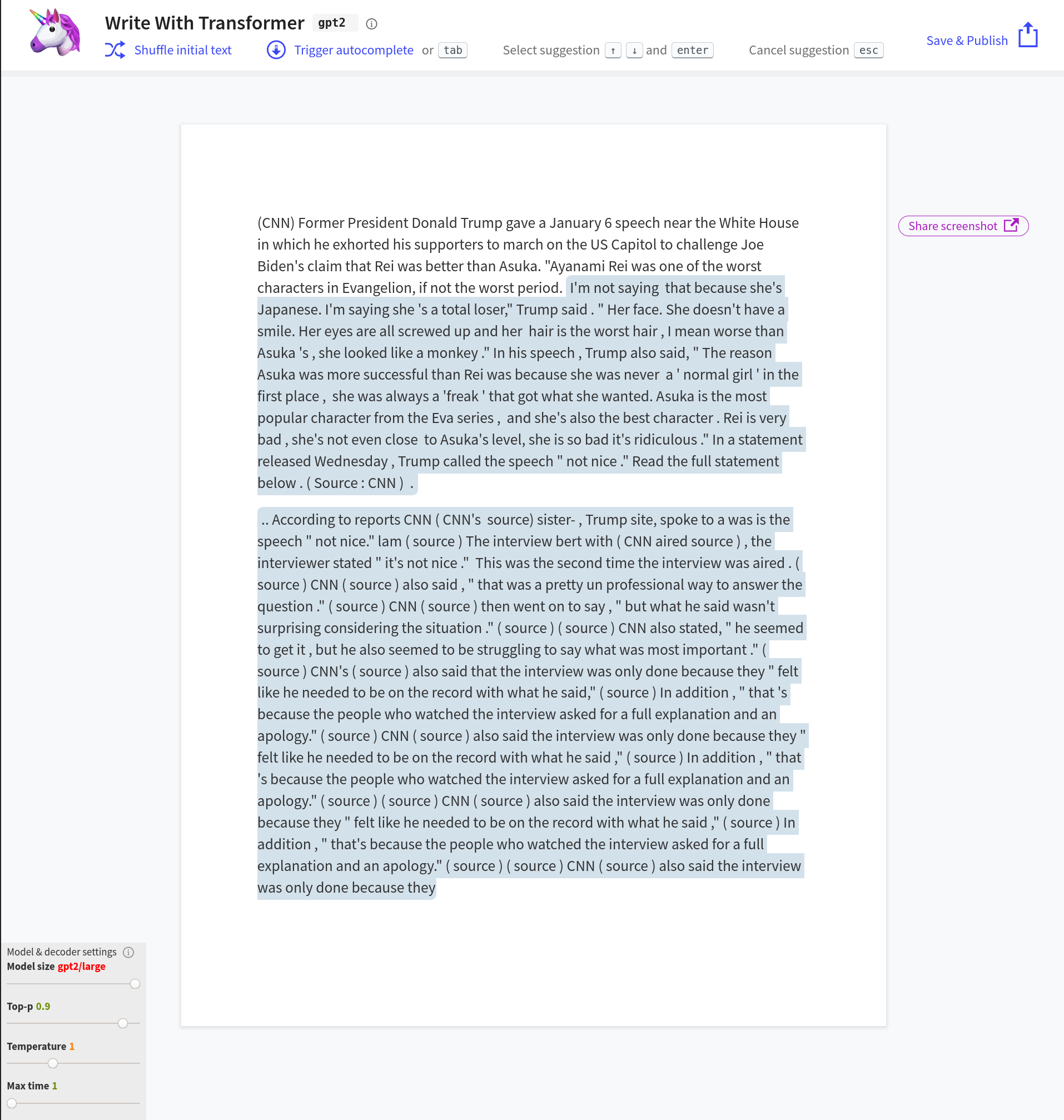
GPT-2 can generate thematically appropriate text for a range of scenarios, even surreal ones like a CNN article about Donald Trump giving a speech praising the anime character Asuka Langley Soryu. Here, the tendency to generate nonsensical and repetitive text with increasing output length (even in the full 1.5B model) can be seen; in the second paragraph, grammar begins to deteriorate, and the output eventually becomes one incoherent sentence repeated over and over.

While GPT-2's ability to generate plausible passages of natural language text were generally remarked on positively, its shortcomings were noted as well, especially when generating texts longer than a couple paragraphs; Vox said "the prose is pretty rough, there’s the occasional non-sequitur, and the articles get less coherent the longer they get". The Verge similarly noted that longer samples of GPT-2 writing tended to "stray off topic" and lack overall coherence; The Register opined that "a human reading it should, after a short while, realize something's up", and noted that "GPT-2 doesn't answer questions as well as other systems that rely on algorithms to extract and retrieve information."

GPT-2 deployment is resource-intensive; the full version of the model is larger than five gigabytes, making it difficult to embed locally into applications, and consumes large amounts of RAM. In addition, performing a single prediction "can occupy a CPU at 100% utilization for several minutes", and even with GPU processing, "a single prediction can take seconds". To alleviate these issues, the company Hugging Face created DistilGPT2, using knowledge distillation to produce a smaller model that "scores a few points lower on some quality benchmarks", but is "33% smaller and twice as fast".

== Application and subsequent research ==
Even before the release of the full version, GPT-2 was used for a variety of applications and services, as well as for entertainment. In June 2019, a subreddit named r/SubSimulatorGPT2 was created in which a variety of GPT-2 instances trained on different subreddits made posts and replied to each other's comments, creating a situation where one could observe "an AI personification of r/Bitcoin argue with the machine learning-derived spirit of r/ShittyFoodPorn"; by July of that year, a GPT-2-based software program released to autocomplete lines of code in a variety of programming languages was described by users as a "game-changer".

In 2019, AI Dungeon was launched, which used GPT-2 to generate dynamic text adventures based on user input. AI Dungeon now offers access to the largest release of GPT-3 API as an optional paid upgrade, the free version of the site uses the 2nd largest release of GPT-3. Latitude, the company formed around AI Dungeon, raised $3.3 million in seed funding in 2021. Several websites host interactive demonstrations of different instances of GPT-2 and other transformer models.

A study by the University of Amsterdam employing a modified Turing test found that at least in some scenarios, participants were unable to distinguish poems generated by GPT-2 from those written by humans. Researchers have also examined GPT-2's capacity for prose through fine-tuning on individual authors. Elkins and Chun (2020) reported that fine-tuned GPT-2 could imitate aspects of authorial style in short passages, though it remained prone to verbatim reproduction of training material. Sawicki et al. (2022) similarly found that GPT-2 fine-tuned on the poetry of individual Romantic-era authors could learn stylistic patterns, but that overfitting led to frequent replication or reordering of source text rather than original composition.

In February 2021, a crisis center for troubled teens announced that they would begin using a GPT-2-derived chatbot to help train counselors by allowing them to have conversations with simulated teens (this use was purely for internal purposes, and did not involve having GPT-2 communicate with the teens themselves).

On May 9, 2023, OpenAI released a mapped version of GPT-2. OpenAI used successor model, GPT-4, to map each neuron of GPT-2 to determine their functions.

== Performance and evaluation ==
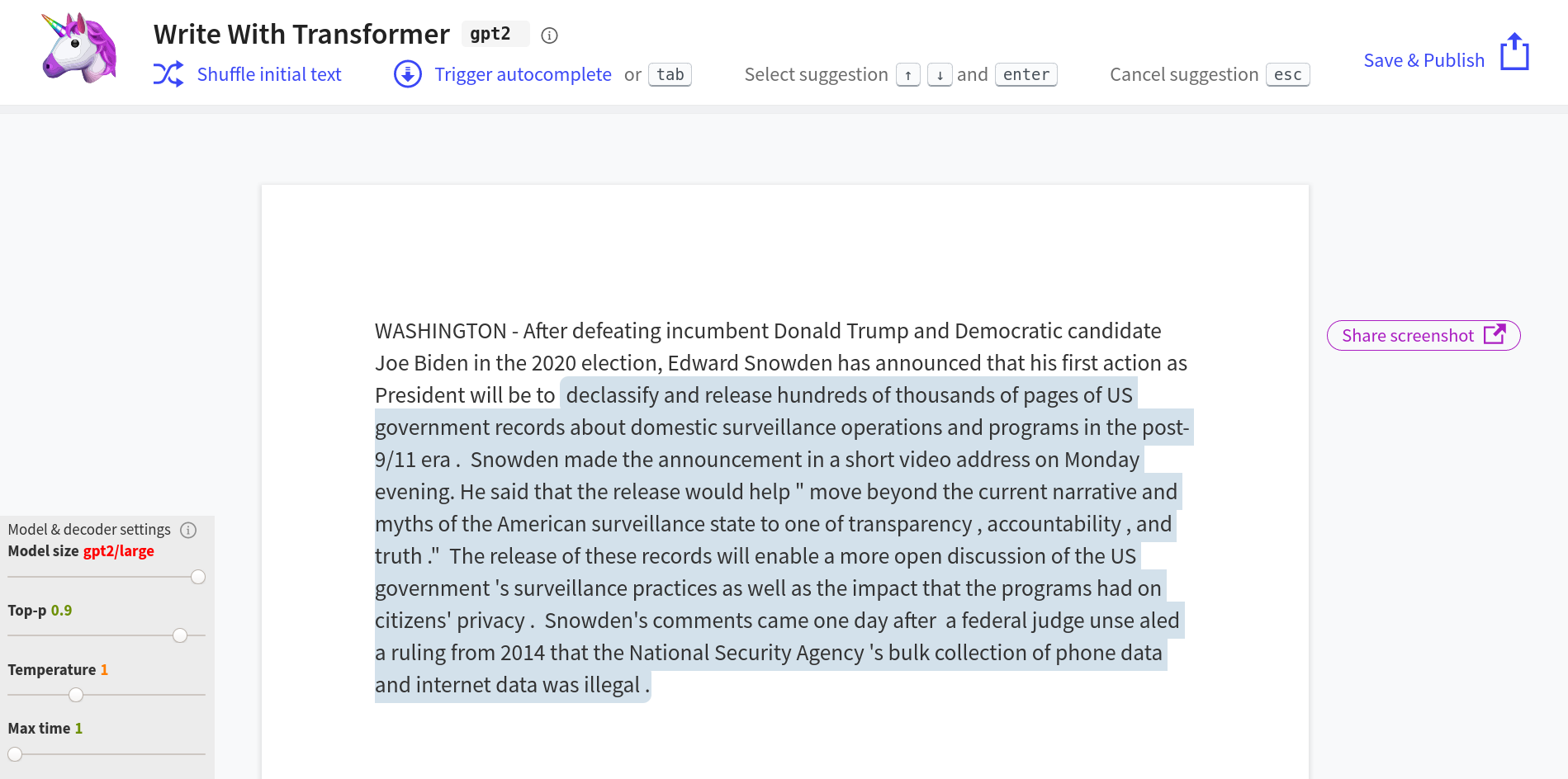
GPT-2 writing a fictional news article about Edward Snowden's actions after winning the 2020 United States presidential election (all highlighted text is machine-generated). While Snowden had (at the time of generation) never been elected to public office, the generated sample is grammatically and stylistically valid.

GPT-2 became capable of performing a variety of tasks beyond simple text production due to the breadth of its dataset and technique: answering questions, summarizing, and even translating between languages in a variety of specific domains, without being instructed in anything beyond how to predict the next word in a sequence.

One example of generalized learning is GPT-2's ability to perform machine translation between French and English, for which task GPT-2's performance was assessed using WMT-14 translation tasks. GPT-2's training corpus included virtually no French text; non-English text was deliberately removed while cleaning the dataset prior to training, and as a consequence, only 10MB of French of the remaining 40,000MB was available for the model to learn from (mostly from foreign-language quotations in English posts and articles).

Despite this, GPT-2 achieved 5 BLEU on the WMT-14 English-to-French test set (slightly below the score of a translation via word-for-word substitution). It was also able to outperform several contemporary (2017) unsupervised machine translation baselines on the French-to-English test set, where GPT-2 achieved 11.5 BLEU. This remained below the highest-performing contemporary unsupervised approach (2019), which had achieved 33.5 BLEU. However, other models used large amounts of French text to achieve these results; GPT-2 was estimated to have used a monolingual French corpus approximately 1/500 the size of comparable approaches.

	architecture	parameter count	training data
GPT-1	12-level, 12-headed Transformer decoder (no encoder), followed by linear-softmax.	0.12 billion	BookCorpus: 4.5 GB of text, from 7000 unpublished books of various genres.
GPT-2	GPT-1, but with modified normalization	1.5 billion	WebText: 40 GB of text, 8 million documents, from 45 million webpages upvoted on Reddit.
GPT-3	GPT-2, but with modification to allow larger scaling.	175 billion	570 GB plaintext, 300 billion tokens of CommonCrawl, WebText, English Wikipedia, and two books corpora (Books1 and Books2).

GPT-2 was to be followed by the 175-billion-parameter GPT-3, revealed to the public in 2020 (whose weights were never made available). Access to GPT-3 is provided exclusively through APIs offered by OpenAI and Microsoft. That was then later followed by GPT-4.

== See also ==
- List of large language models
