= Yang Zhilin =

Chinese businessman (born 1992)

- 杨植麟
- Born: 1992 (age 33–34); Shantou, Guangdong, China
- Education: Tsinghua University (B.S.); Carnegie Mellon University (PhD)
- Known for: Co-founder of Moonshot AI; Co-author of XLNet and Transformer-XL
- Scientific career
- Fields: Artificial intelligence
- Thesis: Advances in Generative Feature Learning (2019)
- Academic advisors: Jie Tang (Tsinghua); Ruslan Salakhutdinov (CMU); William Cohen (CMU)

Chinese name
- Simplified Chinese: 杨植麟
- Traditional Chinese: 楊植麟
Transcriptions
Standard Mandarin
- Hanyu Pinyin: Yáng Zhílín
Yue: Cantonese
- Jyutping: Joeng4 Zik6 Leon4

Yang Zhilin (Chinese: 杨植麟; pinyin: Yáng Zhílín; born 1992) is a Chinese entrepreneur and businessman who is the co-founder of the AI company Moonshot AI. He also co-founded Recurrent AI.

Yang is also the co-author of the papers relating to XLNet and Transformer-XL.

== Early life and education ==
Yang was born in 1992 in Shantou, Guangdong province. He once dreamt of becoming a rock star or a wandering poet. His favourite band is Pink Floyd and his favourite album is The Dark Side of the Moon.

Yang attended Shantou Jinshan Middle School. Despite having no programming background, after one year of training he won first prize in National Olympiad in Informatics in Guangdong province which earned him admission to Tsinghua University. He then took Tsinghua University's independent entrance examination and was admitted again. He nevertheless took the Gaokao, earning a 667 — the top score in Science in Shantau — which served as a third admission ticket to Tsinghua.

At Tsinghua, Yang originally majored in thermal engineering. However, after reading a novel by Haruki Murakami, Yang decided to change his major to computer science. His academic adviser was Jie Tang (co-founder of Z.ai). During his time at university, Yang formed a rock band called Splay (named after Splay tree) where he was drummer and songwriter.

After graduating from Tsinghua in 2015, Yang moved to the United States to pursue his PhD at Carnegie Mellon University. He studied under Ruslan Salakhutdinov (former Apple director of AI research) and William Cohen (Google DeepMind principal scientist).

During his PhD studies, Yang worked at Google Brain and Meta Platforms. He also co-authored papers on computer reasoning and pattern recognition with Turing Award winners Yoshua Bengio and Yann LeCun. His most notable papers authored are on XLNet and Transformer-XL. In 2019, after four years, Yang obtained his PhD from CMU.

== Career ==
In 2016, while a PhD student, Yang co-founded Recurrent AI to develop AI-driven sales tools for businesses. It used the Transformer-XL algorithm to provide solutions. After his graduation in 2019, Yang could have pursued postdoctoral opportunities at Stanford University or MIT and Apple tried to recruit him. Instead, he returned to China to focus on his startup.

In 2020, Yang worked with Huawei on an early version of Huawei PanGu.

In 2021, Yang led a team to work on the development of the Wu Dao LLM at the Beijing Academy of Artificial Intelligence.

Yang has said that ChatGPT's release led him to pursue the generative artificial intelligence trend. He made a trip to the United States to learn more about ChatGPT one month after it was released.

In March 2023, Yang co-founded Moonshot AI with Zhou Xinyu and Wu Yuxin, his Splay band-mates and classmates at Tsinghua. The company name comes from the album The Dark Side of the Moon and the company was launched on its 50th anniversary.

In December 2024, the South China Morning Post was reported that five Recurrent AI investors, among them GSR Ventures, had taken their dispute with Yang over his departure from the company to arbitration in Hong Kong. The Daily Telegraph reports that a settlement was reached through the Hong Kong International Arbitration Centre.

Moonshot AI may list on the Hong Kong Stock Exchange in 2026, where some estimates value it at potentially $30 billion, with Yang's shares worth several billion.

== See also ==
- Liang Wenfeng – Chinese businessman (born 1985)
- Yan Junjie – Chinese businessman (born 1989)
