= Yan Junjie =

Chinese businessman (born 1989)

- 闫俊杰
- Born: 1989 (age 36–37); Xiayi County, Shangqiu, Henan, China
- Education: Southeast University (BSc); Institute of Automation, Chinese Academy of Sciences (PhD)
- Known for: Co-founder of MiniMax Group
- Scientific career
- Fields: Computer vision
- Academic advisors: Stan Z. Li

Chinese name
- Simplified Chinese: 闫俊杰
- Traditional Chinese: 閆俊傑
Transcriptions
Standard Mandarin
- Hanyu Pinyin: Yán Jùnjié
Yue: Cantonese
- Jyutping: Jim4 Zeon3 Git6

Yan Junjie (Chinese: 闫俊杰; pinyin: Yán Jùnjié; born 1989) is a Chinese businessman and the co-founder and chief executive officer of the artificial intelligence (AI) company MiniMax Group.

== Early life and education ==
Yan was born in 1989 in Henan province. He taught himself advanced calculus in high school.

He attended Southeast University graduating in 2006 with a degree in mathematics. He obtained a PhD from the Institute of Automation, Chinese Academy of Sciences in 2015. During his time as a doctoral student, Yan told friends his ambition was to become a Java developer at IBM targeting an annual salary of about CN¥280,000 (US$40,000).

Yan then became a postdoctoral researcher at Tsinghua University Computer Science Department with a focus on deep learning and computer vision.

== Career ==
Yan joined SenseTime as an intern in 2015 and later became vice president.

In 2021, Yan left his job to found MiniMax Group. The name came from the Minimax algorithm.

In January 2026, Yan attended a symposium hosted by Premier Li Qiang. The South China Morning Post described Yan as the second founder of a foundation-model developer to join such a meeting, after Liang Wenfeng.

== Personal life ==
Yan is an enthusiast of the video game Dota 2. He goes by the alias "IO", a pun on technical Input/output and a nod to the Dota wisp hero.

Yan knows Cai Haoyu, the co-founder and CEO of miHoYo, through a shared interest in gaming. miHoYo was one of the early backers of Minimax Group.

In 2019 he started tracking OpenAI after seeing its bots defeat the world's best players in the game. Yan has cited this as a factor in his move from computer vision to natural language processing.

MiniMax Group listed on the Hong Kong Stock Exchange in January 2026. Bloomberg estimated Yan's net worth to be $3.5 billion at the time of the listing.

== See also ==
- Tang Xiao'ou
- Jie Tang
- Yang Zhilin
