= Beijing Academy of Artificial Intelligence =

Chinese AI research laboratory

Coordinates: 39.99°N 116.32°E

- Industry: Artificial intelligence
- Founded: November 2018; 8 years ago
- Founders: Zhang Hongjiang
- Headquarters: Wudaokou, Beijing, China
- Products: WuDao; FlagAI; Jiuding; MetaWorm
- Number of employees: c. 100 (2023)
- Website: www.baai.ac.cn

Beijing Academy of Artificial Intelligence (BAAI) (Chinese: 北京智源人工智能研究院; pinyin: Běijīng Zhìyuán réngōng zhìnéng yánjiùyuàn), also known as Zhiyuan Institute, is a Chinese non-profit artificial intelligence (AI) research laboratory. BAAI conducts AI research and is dedicated to promoting collaboration among academia and industry, as well as fostering top talent and a focus on long-term research on the fundamentals of AI technology. As a collaborative hub, BAAI's founding members include leading AI companies, universities, and research institutes. BAAI is one of pre-eminent AI research institutes in China. To help it reach its goals, BAAI frequently releases new models and open source code. Moreover, BAAI organizes an annual international conference bringing together AI experts, industry leaders, and international talent to discuss challenges and future of AI.

== Products and applications ==
As of 2023, BAAI's research focuses on large pre-trained models (LLMs) and open-source AI infrastructure.

=== WuDao ===
WuDao (Chinese: 悟道; pinyin: wùdào) is a large multimodal pre-trained language model. WuDao 2.0, was announced on 31 May 2022 and has been compared to GPT-3 at the time. But, in comparison, GPT-3 has 175 billion parameters, while WuDao has 1.75 trillion parameters; making it the largest pre-trained model in the world at the time. WuDao was trained on 4.9 terabytes of images and texts (which included 1.2 terabytes of Chinese text and 1.2 terabytes of English text). The chairman of BAAI said that WuDao was an attempt to "create the biggest, most powerful AI model possible"; although direct comparisons between models based on parameter count (i.e. between Wu Dao and GPT-3) do not directly correlate to quality.

WuDao has demonstrated ability to perform natural language processing and image recognition, in addition to generation of text and images. The model can not only write essays, poems and couplets in traditional Chinese, it can both generate text based on static images and generate nearly photorealistic images based on natural language descriptions. It has also showed ability to power virtual chat agents and predict the 3D structures of proteins like AlphaFold.

=== FlagAI ===
FlagAI is an open-source extensible toolkit for large-scale model training and inference. Its goal is to support training, fine-tuning, and deployment of large-scale models on various downstream tasks with multi-modality. Moreover, its open repository includes not only all source-code, but several pre-trained large models. FlagAI is an approved incubation project at the sandbox level of the Linux Foundation.

=== Jiuding ===
Jiuding is an AI-computing platform which focuses on supporting AI innovation. As of September 2022 it provides 1000P computation capacity with 400 Gbit/s high-speed interconnection per server, and support AI chipsets of different architectures. BAAI's platform also includes code compilers for the different AI architectures.

=== BAAIWorm ===
A computational model of the Caenorhabditis elegans (C. elegans) nematode simulating the worm's nervous system along with a "digital body" simulation in real-time, initially named MetaWorm. MetaWorm 1.0 exhibited behaviours that parallel C. elegans in the real world. BAAIWorm is an integrative data-driven model of the same C. elegans.

=== Emu3 ===
Emu3 a suite of multimodal AI models trained solely with next-token prediction on tokenized images, text, and videos.

=== BGE ===
BGE stands for BAAI General Embedding. It is a series of embeddings models developed and published by Beijing Academy of Artificial Intelligence (BAAI).

== U.S. sanctions ==
In March 2025, the U.S. Commerce Department added BAAI to the Entity List for allegedly developing technology for military purposes.

== See also ==
- Artificial intelligence industry in China
