= Ruslan Salakhutdinov =

Canadian AI researcher

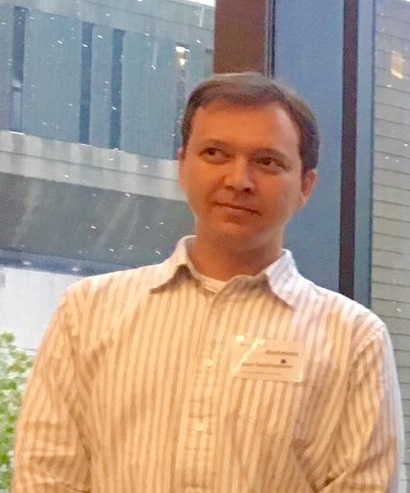
- Salakhutdinov in 2016
- Born: c. 1980 (age 45–46); Tashkent, Uzbekistan. Father Ravil Salahutdinov born in 1949.
- Education: University of Toronto
- Scientific career
- Fields: Computer science Artificial intelligence
- Workplaces: Carnegie Mellon University
- Thesis: Learning deep generative models (2009)
- Doctoral advisor: Geoffrey Hinton
- Notable students: Yang Zhilin

Ruslan Salakhutdinov (Russian: Руслан Салахутдинов; born c. 1980) is an Uzbek researcher working in the field of artificial intelligence.

He specializes in deep learning, probabilistic graphical models, and large-scale optimization.

== Life ==
Salakhutdinov's doctoral advisor was Geoffrey Hinton. Salakhutdinov was considering quitting the field of artificial intelligence when he met Hinton in 2004, but changed his mind after Hinton asked him to take part in a project focused on a new way to train artificial neural networks, which he dubbed "deep belief networks." This research made a large impact on the field of deep learning.

He received his PhD in 2009.

He is well known for having developed Bayesian Program Learning.

== Career ==
Salakhutdinov is a professor of computer science at Carnegie Mellon University.

Since 2009, he has published at least 42 papers on machine learning.

Salakhutdinov joined Apple as its director of AI research in 2016 but left in 2020 to return to Carnegie Mellon University.

In June 2023, Salakhutdinov joined Felix Smart which is a company that uses AI to take care for plants and animals as Board Director.

== Awards ==
He is a CIFAR fellow.
