= Jie Tang =

Computer scientist

- Tang in 2024
- Born: 1977 (age 48–49)
- Education: Tsinghua University
- Awards: IEEE Fellow (2021); ACM Fellow (2021)
- Scientific career
- Fields: social networks data mining machine learning knowledge graphs
- Workplaces: Tsinghua University
- Notable students: Yang Zhilin
- Website: keg.cs.tsinghua.edu.cn/jietang/

Jie Tang (born 1977) is a full-time professor at the Department of Computer Science of Tsinghua University. He received a PhD in computer science from the same university in 2006. He is known for building the academic social network search system AMiner (formerly known as ArnetMiner), which was launched in March 2006 and now has attracted 2,766,356 independent IP accesses from 220 countries. His research interests include social networks and data mining.

He was elevated to IEEE Fellow in 2021 "for contributions to knowledge discovery from data and social network mining". He was elevated to ACM Fellow in 2022 "for contributions to information and social network mining". He was elected AAAI Fellow in 2023.

He is also a co-founder of Z.ai. As of March 2026, Forbes has estimated his net worth to be $1.9 billion.

== See also ==
- Yang Zhilin
