= Anton Korinek =

Austrian and American economist

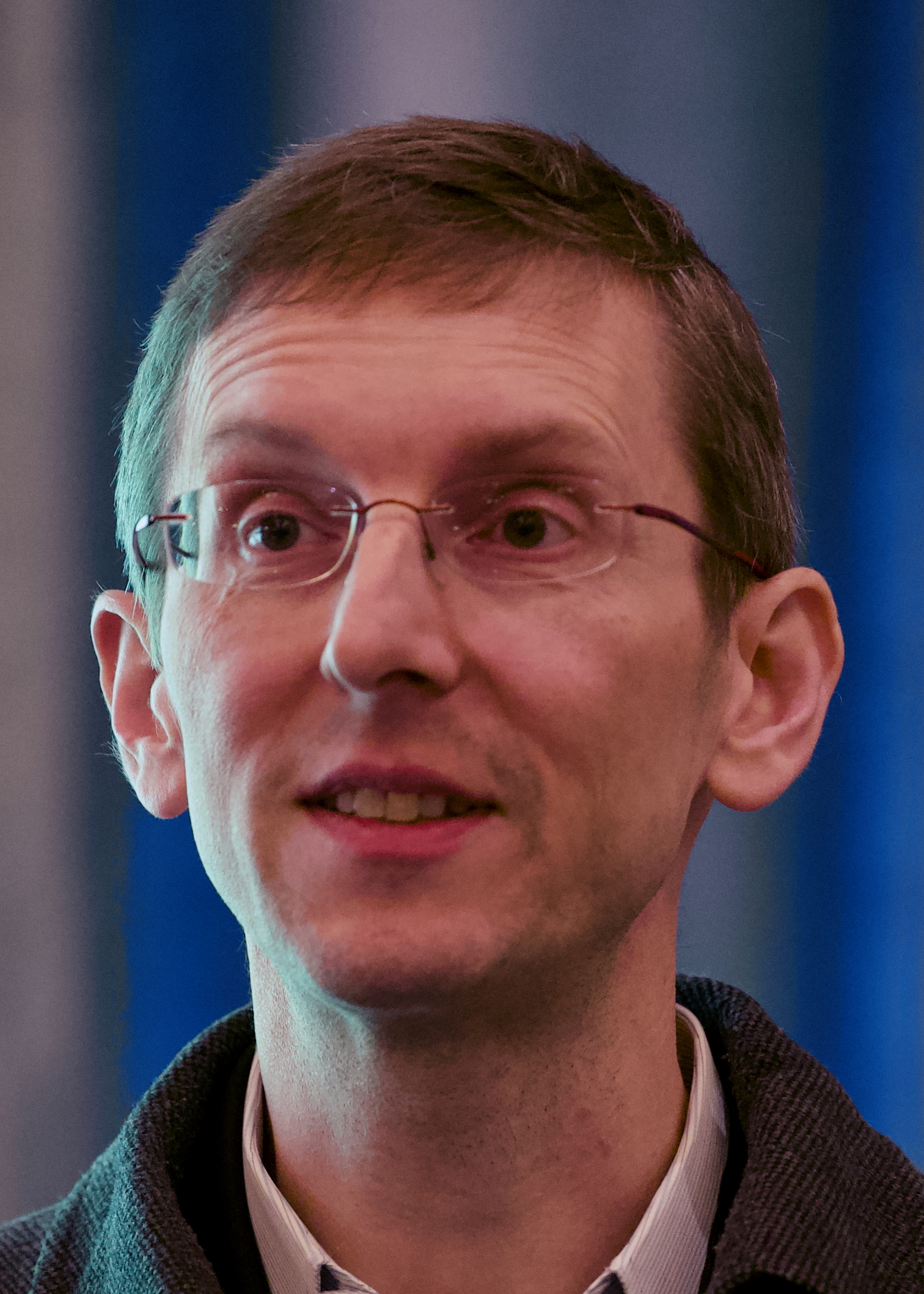
- Korinek at ASSA 2026

Academic background
- Education: University of Vienna; Columbia University
- Thesis: Dollar borrowing in emerging markets (2007)
- Doctoral advisor: Joseph Stiglitz
- Other advisor: Alexandre Lamfalussy

Academic work
- Discipline: Macroeconomics, International finance, Economics of AI
- Institutions: University of Maryland, College Park; Johns Hopkins University; University of Virginia
- Website: www.korinek.com

Anton Korinek is an Austrian and American economist and professor at the University of Virginia Department of Economics and the Darden School of Business. He is also a Nonresident Senior Fellow at the Brookings Institution. His current research primarily focuses on macroeconomics, international finance, and the economic implications of artificial intelligence (AI). In 2025, he was named to Time magazine’s Time 100 AI list, which recognizes influential figures shaping the development and governance of artificial intelligence.

== Education ==
Korinek earned his PhD in economics from Columbia University in 2007, where his dissertation was supervised by Nobel Prize laureate Joseph Stiglitz.

== Career and research ==
Prior to joining the University of Virginia, Korinek held faculty positions at the University of Maryland, College Park and Johns Hopkins University. He is a Research Associate at the National Bureau of Economic Research (NBER) in the International Finance and Macroeconomics and Productivity, Innovation, and Entrepreneurship programs, and a Research Fellow at the Centre for Economic Policy Research (CEPR).

== AI ==
Korinek sits on Anthropic's Economic Advisory Council.

Korinek has says AI might boost productivity in ways that would reduce demand for human labor. In a Vox Media podcast interview Korinek stated: "Once the AI revolution really hits, there is no guarantee that we can earn a decent living based on the value of our labor anymore. I do believe that we are going to need a new system of income distribution at that point."

== Honors and recognition ==
- TIME100 AI (2025): Named as one of the 100 most influential people in artificial intelligence.
- Vox Future Perfect 50 (2024): Recognized for his work on the economics of artificial general intelligence (AGI).

== Selected publications ==
- Korinek, Anton; Stiglitz, Joseph E. (2019). "Artificial Intelligence and Its Implications for Income Distribution and Unemployment". The Economics of Artificial Intelligence: An Agenda. University of Chicago Press: 349–390. doi:10.7208/chicago/9780226613475.003.0014. ISBN 978-0-226-61333-8.
- Korinek, Anton; Trammell, Phil (September 2025). "Economic Growth under Transformative AI". Annual Review of Economics.
- Agrawal, Ajay; Brynjolfsson, Erik; Korinek, Anton (August 2025), The Economics of Transformative AI: A Research Agenda (Working Paper), University of Virginia / Stanford Digital Economy Lab
