= Autarchy =

Autarchy may refer to:

- Autarchism, an ideology or practice that promotes individual self-governance
- Autocracy, an ideology or practice that promotes concentration of power in the hands of one person
- Autarky, an ideology or practice that promotes (social, cultural, economic) self-sufficiency

== See also ==
- Autonomy (disambiguation)
