= Canny =

Canny is a surname. Notable people with the surname include:

- John Canny, American-based Australian computer scientist, namesake of the Canny edge detector
- Lauryn Canny, Irish former child actress
- Nicholas Canny (born 1944), Irish historian
- Paddy Canny (1919–2008), Irish fiddler
- Steven Canny (born 1969), English playwright and BBC executive producer

== See also ==
- Canny edge detector, an image operator which uses a multi-stage algorithm to detect edges
- Uncanny
