= Dinesh Manocha =

Indian-American computer scientist and professor

- Education: IIT Delhi; University of California, Berkeley
- Awards: Fellow of the ACM; Sloan Fellow; UNC Hettleman Prize
- Scientific career
- Fields: Computer scientist
- Workplaces: University of North Carolina at Chapel Hill; University of Maryland, College Park
- Doctoral advisor: John F. Canny

Dinesh Manocha is an Indian-American computer scientist and academic whose research focuses on computer graphics, computational geometry, robotics, virtual and augmented reality, artificial intelligence, and high-performance computing. He is a Distinguished University Professor and the Paul Chrisman Iribe Professor of Computer Science and Electrical and Computer Engineering at the University of Maryland, College Park. He is also affiliated with the University of Maryland Institute for Advanced Computer Studies, the Institute for Systems Research, and the Maryland Robotics Center.

== Early life and education ==
Manocha received a Bachelor of Technology degree in computer science and engineering from the Indian Institute of Technology Delhi in 1987. He subsequently attended the University of California, Berkeley, where he received an M.S. in computer science in 1990 and a Ph.D. in computer science in 1992. His doctoral adviser was John Canny.

== Academic career ==
Manocha joined the faculty of the University of North Carolina at Chapel Hill in 1992. During his time at UNC, he held the Matthew Mason/Phi Delta Theta Distinguished Professorship in Computer Science and led research in computer graphics, geometric computing, robotics, and virtual environments. He was also a visiting researcher at Intel in 1998 and 1999 and at Microsoft in 2008.

In 2018, Manocha joined the University of Maryland as the Paul Chrisman Iribe Professor of Computer Science (UMD Department of Computer Science with joint appointment in electrical and computer engineering and University of Maryland Institute for Advanced Computer Studies. He Is also affiliated with Institute of Systems Research, Maryland Robotics Center, ARLIS, and Applied Mathematics & Statistics, and Scientific Computation Program

At Maryland, Manocha has co-led the GAMMA research group, which works on geometric algorithms, simulation, computer graphics, robotics, and virtual environments. His research has included collaborations with government laboratories, universities, and technology companies.

== Research ==
Manocha's research combines algorithms, computational geometry, simulation, and machine learning with applications in computer graphics and robotics. His work has covered both fundamental algorithms and systems intended for interactive or real-time computation.

=== Geometric Computing and Computer Graphics ===
Manocha's research in geometric computing and computer graphics has focused on algorithms for the representation, processing, and visualization of complex three-dimensional environments. His work has addressed problems in geometric modeling, visibility computation, model simplification, rendering, and interactive simulation. Beginning in the 1990s, he and his collaborators developed methods for rendering and navigating large geometric models, including computer-aided design (CAD) structures, terrain, scanned objects, and scientific datasets. These methods included algorithms for visibility determination, image-based rendering, and the management of memory and data access in large-scale visualization systems. Subsequent research extended to interactive ray tracing of dynamic scenes and sound rendering. Applications included virtual reality, flight simulation, engineering visualization, and geographic information systems.

Collision detection and proximity computation have been another major part of Manocha's research in geometric computing. In 1995, he co-developed I-COLLIDE, a system for detecting collisions between moving objects using hierarchical bounding-volume representations and geometric separation tests. His work included OBBTree, a method that uses oriented bounding boxes to organize geometric models for collision and interference detection. He also co-developed the Proximity Query Package (PQP), a library for collision and distance computations between complex geometric objects. These methods have been applied in robot motion planning, virtual prototyping, computer animation, and physics-based simulation. Later work in this area included the Flexible Collision Library (FCL), an open-source framework for collision and proximity queries..

=== Physically based simulation ===
Manocha has worked extensively on physically based modeling and simulation, which seeks to reproduce the behavior of physical systems through computational models. His research has included algorithms for rigid-body dynamics, deformable objects, geometric interactions, and simulation environments. The work has been applied to computer graphics and virtual environments, where physically based simulation can be used to model interactions between objects and environments. His group developed software packages for physics-based simulation and virtual prototyping that were subsequently incorporated into commercial software systems.

=== GPU Computing ===
Another area of Manocha's research has been the use of graphics processing units (GPUs) for general-purpose computation. His work investigated methods for mapping geometric, simulation, and visualization algorithms onto parallel processors.The research addressed problems such as collision detection, geometric computation, physical simulation, and visualization. GPU-based algorithms can perform many operations concurrently, allowing computationally intensive graphics and simulation tasks to be carried out at interactive rates.

His 1999 algorithm for computing generalized Voronoi diagrams on graphics hardware exploits rasterization pipelines for sub-second performance on diagrams with millions of sites, marking an early milestone in GPU computing for geometric problems.

In 2006, he co-developed GPUTeraSort, an external sorting algorithm that used graphics processors to sort large datasets. The system won the Indy category of the PennySort benchmark, commonly referred to as IndySort, with a reported sorting volume of 59 GB. His group also investigated GPU acceleration for modeling and simulation applications developed for the United States Army, work that was covered in a Defense Advanced Research Projects Agency (DARPA) legacy press release in August 2005. Other contributions included GPU-based algorithms for fast Fourier transforms (FFT) and dense linear algebra, as well as research into memory models and cache-efficient computation on graphics processors.

In 2009, he proposed fast BVH construction on GPUs, enabling parallel top-down builds that reduce traversal times for ray tracing by factors of 5-10 compared to CPU methods, crucial for interactive applications. These innovations, including GPU-based collision culling, have impacted software tools like game engines by facilitating scalable simulations of deformable objects and large scenes.

=== Virtual and augmented reality ===
Manocha's research has also focused on virtual reality (VR) and augmented reality (AR). His work has addressed the algorithms required to construct and simulate interactive virtual environments, including geometric modeling, physics-based simulation, navigation, and audio.

He has investigated computational methods for real-time interaction within virtual environments and has applied geometric and simulation techniques to VR systems. In 2024, he was inducted into the IEEE VGTC Virtual Reality Academy for contributions to computer graphics and computational geometry for virtual reality.

=== Robotics and autonomous systems ===
Manocha's research in robotics has focused on planning, navigation, simulation, and interaction among multiple autonomous agents. His work applies computational geometry and simulation to problems in which robots must navigate through environments containing obstacles or other moving agents.

His research has included robot motion planning, multi-agent navigation, and algorithms for coordinating the movements of multiple agents. These methods can be used in robotics, virtual environments, autonomous vehicles, and simulation-based training.

His more recent research interests include autonomous driving.

=== Multi-agent simulation ===
Manocha's research includes multi-agent simulation, with a focus on computational models of pedestrian and crowd movement. His work has developed navigation algorithms for collision-free movement and has been applied to computer games, virtual environments, architectural simulation, evacuation analysis, and robotics. His group's navigation technologies have also been integrated into game engines and simulation systems.

=== Acoustic simulation and sound rendering ===
Manocha's research also includes acoustic simulation, focusing on computational models of sound propagation and interaction with physical environments. His work has applications in virtual environments, architectural acoustics, and environmental noise. He co-founded Impulsonic, whose physics-based audio technology was acquired by Valve in 2016 and incorporated into its Steam Audio software development kit.

=== Artificial intelligence and machine learning ===
Manocha's research includes artificial intelligence and machine learning, with applications in computer graphics, robotics, simulation, and autonomous systems. His work has included machine-learning methods for multi-agent systems, autonomous navigation, perception, and simulation, as well as applications in virtual environments and autonomous systems.

His research also includes high-performance and scientific computing, combining machine-learning methods with parallel algorithms and specialized computing hardware.

=== Software and technology transfer ===
His research group has developed software packages for collision detection, triangulation, GPU-based algorithms, multi-agent simulation, texture compression, solid modeling, solving algebraic systems, etc. These packages have been downloaded by more than 500,000 users worldwide and licensed to more than 60 industrial organizations including Intel, Microsoft, Disney, Ford, Kawasaki, Siemens, Phillips Labs, MSC Software, Lockheed Martin, Raytheon etc.

=== Publications and academic service ===
Manocha has published in computer graphics, computational geometry, robotics, virtual reality, high-performance computing, databases, and related fields, with more than 900 papers, and 11 books and monographs. He has received 22 best paper or test of time awards.

=== Entrepreneurship ===
Manocha has participated in the commercialization of research originating from his academic groups. He was a co-founder of Impulsonic, which developed physics-based audio simulation technology and was acquired by Valve in 2016. The resulting technology was incorporated into Steam Audio. He is also a co-founder of Inception Robotics.

== Personal life ==
Manocha is married to his frequent collaborator and UMD faculty colleague, Ming C. Lin.

== Awards and honors ==
Manocha received the Alfred P. Sloan Research Fellowship and the National Science Foundation (NSF) CAREER Award in 1995, followed by the Office of Naval Research Young Investigator Award in 1996. In 1998, he received the Hettleman Prize for Artistic and Scholarly Achievement from the University of North Carolina at Chapel Hill.

He was named an ACM Fellow in 2009, an AAAS Fellow in 2011, and an IEEE Fellow in 2012. He was elected an AAAI Fellow in 2018 and inducted into the ACM SIGGRAPH Academy in 2019. In 2020, he received the Pierre Bézier Award from the Solid Modeling Association. He was elected a Fellow of the National Academy of Inventors in 2023and inducted into the IEEE VGTC Virtual Reality Academy in 2024.

His honors include the Distinguished Alumni Award from the Indian Institute of Technology Delhi in 2011, the Distinguished Career in Computer Science Award from the Washington Academy of Sciences in 2019, and the Verisk AI Faculty Research Award in 2022. In 2024, he received the Jimmy H.C. Lin Award for Innovation and Invention from the University of Maryland.

Manocha and his collaborators have received numerous best paper awards at conferences in computer graphics, robotics, visualization, and computational geometry. These include awards at Supercomputing (1996), Eurographics (1999), ACM Multimedia (2001), the ACM Solid Modeling Conference (2003), Pacific Graphics (2004), IEEE Virtual Reality (2005 and 2021), and ACM VRST (2007). In 2026, he received the IEEE International Conference on Robotics and Automation (ICRA) Most Influential Paper Award. He also received an NVIDIA Research Award in 2026
