= Computer Vision Annotation Tool =

Free and open source, web-based image and video annotation tool

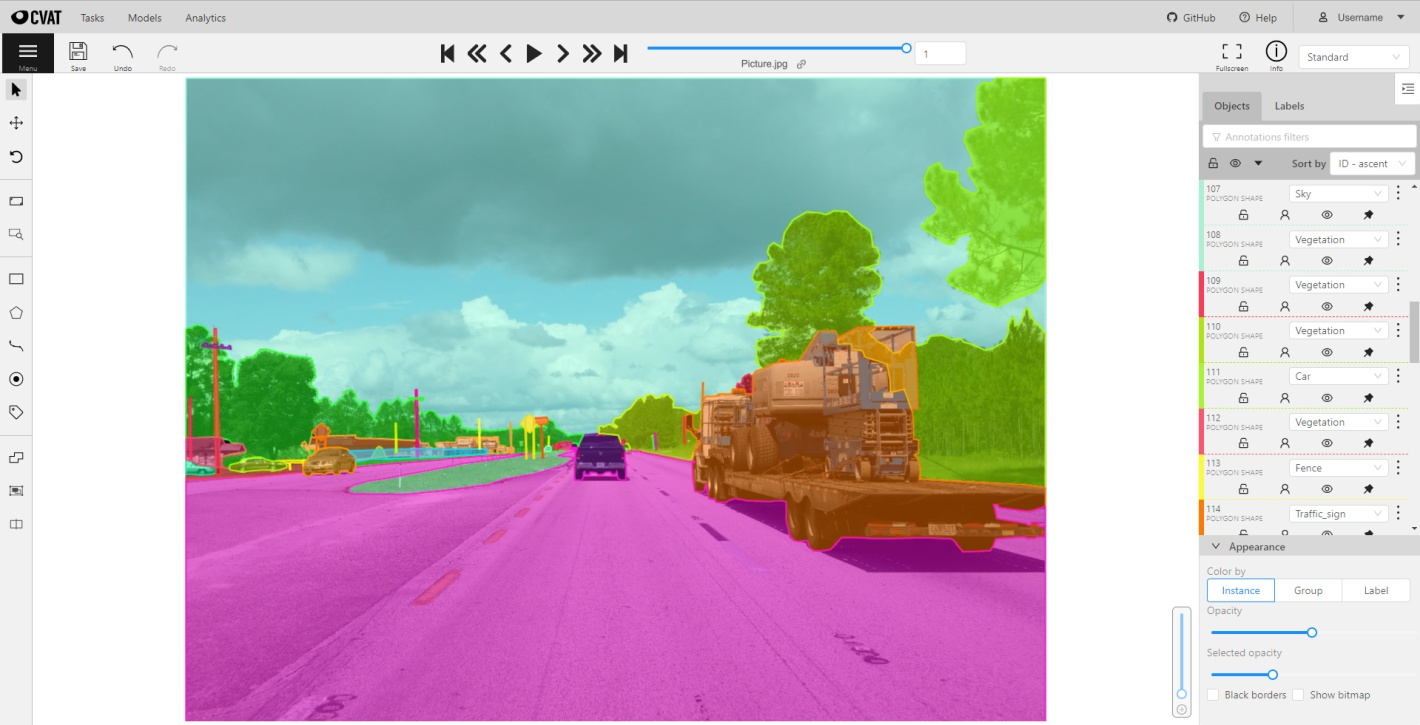
- CVAT version 2.0.0
- Developer: CVAT.ai
- Release: June 29, 2018; 8 years ago
- Written in: JavaScript, CSS, Python, HTML, Django
- Operating system: Windows 7 or later, OS X 10.11 or later, Linux
- Available in: English (US)
- Type: Image and video annotation tool
- License: MIT License
- Website: www.cvat.ai
- Repository: github.com/cvat-ai/cvat

Computer Vision Annotation Tool (CVAT) is an open source, web-based image and video annotation tool used for labeling data for computer vision algorithms. Originally developed by Intel, CVAT is designed for use by a professional data annotation team, with a user interface optimized for computer vision annotation tasks.

CVAT supports the primary tasks of supervised machine learning: object detection, image classification, and image segmentation. CVAT allows users to annotate data for each of these cases.

CVAT has many features, including interpolation of shapes between key frames, semi-automatic annotation using deep learning models, shortcuts for most critical actions, a dashboard with a list of annotation projects and tasks, LDAP and basic access authentication, etc.

CVAT is written mainly in TypeScript, React, Ant Design, CSS, Python, and Django. It is distributed under the MIT License, and its source code is available on GitHub.

CVAT team hosts an online version of the data annotation platform at cvat.ai as SaaS.

== See also ==
- List of manual image annotation tools
- VoTT
