= VoTT =

Microsoft open source image annotation tool

- Original author(s): Commercial Software Engineering (CSE) group at Microsoft
- Developer(s): Microsoft and community
- Initial release: 2018; 7 years ago
- Final release: v2.2.0 / June 3, 2020; 5 years ago
- Repository: github.com/microsoft/VoTT
- Written in: TypeScript
- Operating system: Windows, Linux, macOS
- Platform: Cross-platform
- Type: Image annotation tool
- License: MIT License
- Website: vott.z22.web.core.windows.net

VoTT (Visual Object Tagging Tool) was a free and open source Electron app for image annotation and labeling developed by Microsoft. The software is written in the TypeScript programming language and used for building end-to-end object detection models from image and videos assets for computer vision algorithms.

The VoTT source code is licensed under MIT License and available on GitHub. As of December 7, 2021, the project was no longer being maintained and its GitHub repository was made read-only.

== Overview ==
VoTT is a React+Redux web application that requires Node.js and npm. It is available as a stand-alone web application and can be used in any modern web browser.

Notable features include the ability to label images or video frames, support for importing data from local or cloud storage providers, and support for exporting labeled data to local or cloud storage providers.

Labeled assets can be exported into the following formats:

- Comma-separated values (CSV)
- Microsoft Azure Custom Vision Service
- Microsoft Cognitive Toolkit (CNTK)
- TensorFlow (Pascal VOC and TFRecords)
- VoTT (generic JSON schema)

== See also ==
- List of manual image annotation tools
- Computer Vision Annotation Tool
- LabelMe
- Supervised learning
- Image segmentation
