= List of manual image annotation tools =

Manual image annotation is the process of manually defining regions in an image and creating a textual description of those regions. Such annotations can for instance be used to train machine learning algorithms for computer vision applications.

This is a list of computer software which can be used for manual annotation of images.

Software	Description	Platform	License	References
Computer Vision Annotation Tool (CVAT)	Computer Vision Annotation Tool (CVAT) is an open source, web-based annotation tool which helps to label video and images for computer vision algorithms. CVAT has many powerful features: interpolation of bounding boxes between key frames, automatic annotation using TensorFlow OD API and deep learning models in Intel OpenVINO IR format, shortcuts for most of critical actions, dashboard with a list of annotation tasks, LDAP and basic authorizations, etc. It was created for and used by a professional data annotation team. UX and UI were optimized especially for computer vision annotation tasks.	JavaScript, HTML, CSS, Python, Django	MIT License	
LabelMe	Online annotation tool to build image databases for computer vision research.	Perl, JavaScript, HTML, CSS	MIT License	
TagLab	Desktop open source interactive software system for facilitating the precise annotation of benthic species in orthophoto of the bottom of the sea.	Python	GPL	
VoTT (Visual Object Tagging Tool)	Free and open source electron app for image annotation and labeling developed by Microsoft.	TypeScript/Electron (Windows, Linux, macOS)	MIT License	
