= Ming C. Lin =

American computer scientist

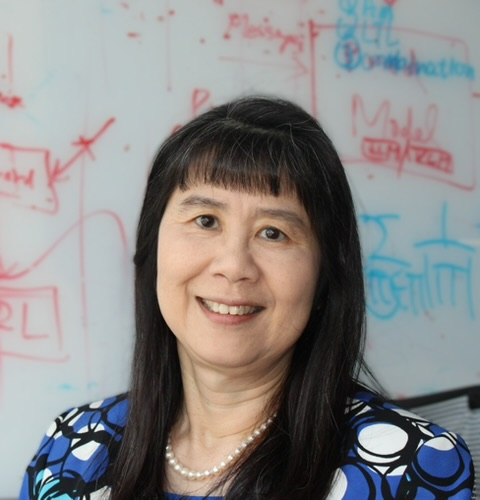
- Born: Taiwan
- Education: University of California, Berkeley (BS, MS, PhD)
- Known for: collision detection; physical simulation
- Awards: IEEE Fellow; ACM Fellow; IEEE VGTC VR Technical Achievement Award; UNC Hettleman Prize
- Scientific career
- Fields: Computer science
- Institutions: University of Maryland, College Park; University of North Carolina at Chapel Hill
- Thesis: Efficient Collision Detection for Animation and Robotics (1994)
- Doctoral advisor: John F. Canny

Ming Chieh Lin is a Taiwanese-American computer scientist and a Barry Mersky and Capital One Endowed Professor at the University of Maryland, College Park, where she is also the former chair of the Department of Computer Science. Prior to moving to Maryland in 2018, Lin was the John R. & Louise S. Parker Distinguished Professor of Computer Science at the University of North Carolina at Chapel Hill.

== Early life and education ==
Lin was born in Taiwan. Her family immigrated to the United States in 1980 and settled in California, where she attended Sunny Hills High School. After high school, she graduated from the University of California, Berkeley, with a Bachelor of Science (B.S.) in 1988, a Master of Science (M.S.) in 1991, and a Ph.D. in computer science and electrical engineering in 1993. She joined the UNC faculty in 1997.

== Career ==
Lin is known for her work on collision detection, and in particular for the Lin–Canny algorithm for maintaining the closest pair of features of two moving objects, for the idea (with Cohen, Manocha, and Ponamgi) of using axis-aligned bounding boxes to quickly eliminate from consideration pairs of objects that are far from colliding, and for additional speedups to collision detection using bounding box hierarchies. Her software libraries implementing these algorithms are widely used in commercial applications including computer aided design and computer games. More generally, her research interests are in physically based modeling, haptics, robotics, 3D computer graphics, computational geometry, and interactive computer simulation.

Lin is the Editor in Chief Emeritus of IEEE Transactions on Visualization and Computer Graphics (2011-2014). She is currently a member of the IEEE Computer Society Board of Governors and a member of Computing Research Association-Women (CRA-W) Board of Directors.

== Awards and honors ==
In 2003, UNC gave Lin their Hettleman Prize for Scholarly and Artistic Achievements, and in 2007, she was named as the Beverly W. Long Distinguished Professor. She has won many best-paper awards for her research, and was given the IEEE Visualization and Graphics Technical Committee 2010 Virtual Reality Technical Achievement Award "in recognition of her seminal contributions in the area of interactive physics-based interaction and simulation for virtual environments." In 2011 she was listed as a fellow of the Association for Computing Machinery for her research in geometric modeling and computer graphics, and she was listed as one of the 2012 IEEE Fellows for her "contributions to real-time physics-based interaction and simulation for virtual environments, robotics and haptics".

== Personal life ==
Lin is married to her frequent collaborator and UMD faculty colleague, Dinesh Manocha.
