= Autonomic =

Autonomic can refer to:

- Autonomic nervous system, a division of the peripheral nervous system that supplies smooth muscle and glands, and thus influences the function of internal organs
- Autonomic computing, the self-managing characteristics of distributed computing resources

== See also ==
- Autonomy (disambiguation)
