= Timothy D. Barfoot =

Canadian roboticist and researcher

- Born: October 21, 1973 (age 52)
- Education: University of Toronto
- Known for: Visual Teach and Repeat (VT&R); State Estimation for Robotics
- Awards: IEEE Fellow
- Scientific career
- Fields: Robotics, autonomous systems, robot state estimation
- Workplaces: University of Toronto; MDA Space; Apple; Oxa Autonomy

Timothy D. Barfoot (born 21 October 1973) is a Canadian roboticist and researcher. He is a Professor at the University of Toronto, an IEEE Fellow and Fellow of the Canadian Academy of Engineering recognized for contributions to autonomous systems, field robotics and robot state estimation. His research has influenced how robots navigate in challenging environments like space, underground mines and warehouses. Since 2025, Barfoot has served as Editor-in-Chief of IEEE Transactions on Field Robotics. In July 2026, he was appointed Director of the University of Toronto Institute for Aerospace Studies.

== Research ==
Barfoot leads the Autonomous Space Robotics Lab at the University of Toronto. His research focuses on localization, mapping, planning and control for robots operating in large-scale, unstructured environments using onboard sensing such as cameras, lidar and radar. His work addresses long-term autonomy and robustness in GPS-denied environments.

Barfoot serves as a co-investigator in the University of Toronto’s WinTOR research program, which focuses on developing technologies for all-weather autonomous driving.

Barfoot developed Visual Teach and Repeat (VT&R), a navigation system for mobile robots. VT&R enables robots to autonomously repeat previously taught paths using local submaps, supporting long-term navigation through multi-experience localization. The system has been packaged into Clearpath Robotics by Rockwell Automation platforms.

As part of a team led by MDA Space, Barfoot is developing technology for Canada’s proposed Lunar Utility Vehicle (LUV). Barfoot’s research focuses on autonomy algorithms that will enable the LUV to navigate on its own between cargo drop-off points.

== Career ==
Barfoot earned a B.A.Sc. in Engineering Science (Aerospace) from the University of Toronto in 1997 and a Ph.D. in Aerospace Engineering from the University of Toronto Institute for Aerospace Studies in 2002.

After earning his Ph.D. in aerospace engineering from the University of Toronto in 2002, Barfoot joined MDA Robotics (now MDA Space) as a member of technical staff, later becoming senior member. At MDA, he worked on autonomous navigation technologies for planetary rovers and terrestrial vehicles.

In 2007, Barfoot joined the University of Toronto as an Assistant Professor. He was promoted to Professor in 2016. From 2017 to 2019, he served as Director of Autonomous Systems at Apple, returning to the University of Toronto in 2019, and served as the Director the University of Toronto Robotics Institute from 2025 to 2026. Barfoot is also a Distinguished Engineer at Oxa Autonomy (part time).

Barfoot authored State Estimation for Robotics, a textbook first published in 2017, with a second edition released in 2024.

== Select awards and honours ==
- Fellow of the Canadian Academy of Engineering (2026)
- IEEE ICRA Best Conference Paper Award (2025)
- CRV Best Paper Award in Robotics (2025)
- Gordon N. Patterson Lecturer (2025)
- IEEE ICRA Best Student Paper Award (2021)
- IEEE Fellow (2020)
- IEEE ICRA KUKA Service Robotics Best Paper (2010)
- Canada Research Chair in Autonomous Space Robotics (Tier 2, 2007–2017)
