= CIFAR-10 =

Image dataset

The CIFAR-10 dataset (Canadian Institute For Advanced Research) is a collection of images that are commonly used to train machine learning and computer vision algorithms. It is one of the most widely used datasets for machine learning research. The CIFAR-10 dataset contains 60,000 32x32 color images in 10 different classes. The 10 different classes represent airplanes, cars, birds, cats, deer, dogs, frogs, horses, ships, and trucks. There are 6,000 images of each class.

Computer algorithms for recognizing objects in photos often learn by example. CIFAR-10 is a set of images that can be used to teach a computer how to recognize objects. Since the images in CIFAR-10 are low-resolution (32x32), this dataset can allow researchers to quickly try different algorithms to see what works.

CIFAR-10 is a labeled subset of the 80 Million Tiny Images dataset from 2008, published in 2009. When the dataset was created, students were paid to label all of the images.

Various kinds of convolutional neural networks tend to be the best at recognizing the images in CIFAR-10.

== Research papers claiming state-of-the-art results on CIFAR-10 ==
This is a table of some of the research papers that claim to have achieved state-of-the-art results on the CIFAR-10 dataset. Not all papers are standardized on the same pre-processing techniques, like image flipping or image shifting. For that reason, it is possible that one paper's claim of state-of-the-art could have a higher error rate than an older state-of-the-art claim but still be valid.

Paper title	Error rate (%)	Publication date
Convolutional Deep Belief Networks on CIFAR-10	21.1	August, 2010
Maxout Networks	9.38	February 13, 2013
Wide Residual Networks	4.0	May 23, 2016
Neural Architecture Search with Reinforcement Learning	3.65	November 4, 2016
Fractional Max-Pooling	3.47	December 18, 2014
Densely Connected Convolutional Networks	3.46	August 24, 2016
Shake-Shake regularization	2.86	May 21, 2017
Coupled Ensembles of Neural Networks	2.68	September 18, 2017
ShakeDrop regularization	2.67	Feb 7, 2018
Improved Regularization of Convolutional Neural Networks with Cutout	2.56	Aug 15, 2017
Regularized Evolution for Image Classifier Architecture Search	2.13	Feb 6, 2018
Rethinking Recurrent Neural Networks and other Improvements for Image Classification	1.64	July 31, 2020
AutoAugment: Learning Augmentation Policies from Data	1.48	May 24, 2018
A Survey on Neural Architecture Search	1.33	May 4, 2019
GPipe: Efficient Training of Giant Neural Networks using Pipeline Parallelism	1.00	Nov 16, 2018
Reduction of Class Activation Uncertainty with Background Information	0.95	May 5, 2023
An Image is Worth 16x16 Words: Transformers for Image Recognition at Scale	0.5	2021

== Benchmarks ==
CIFAR-10 is also used as a performance benchmark for teams competing to run neural networks faster and cheaper. DAWNBench has benchmark data on their website.

== See also ==
- List of datasets for machine learning research
- MNIST database
