= Abeba Birhane =

Ethiopian-born cognitive scientist

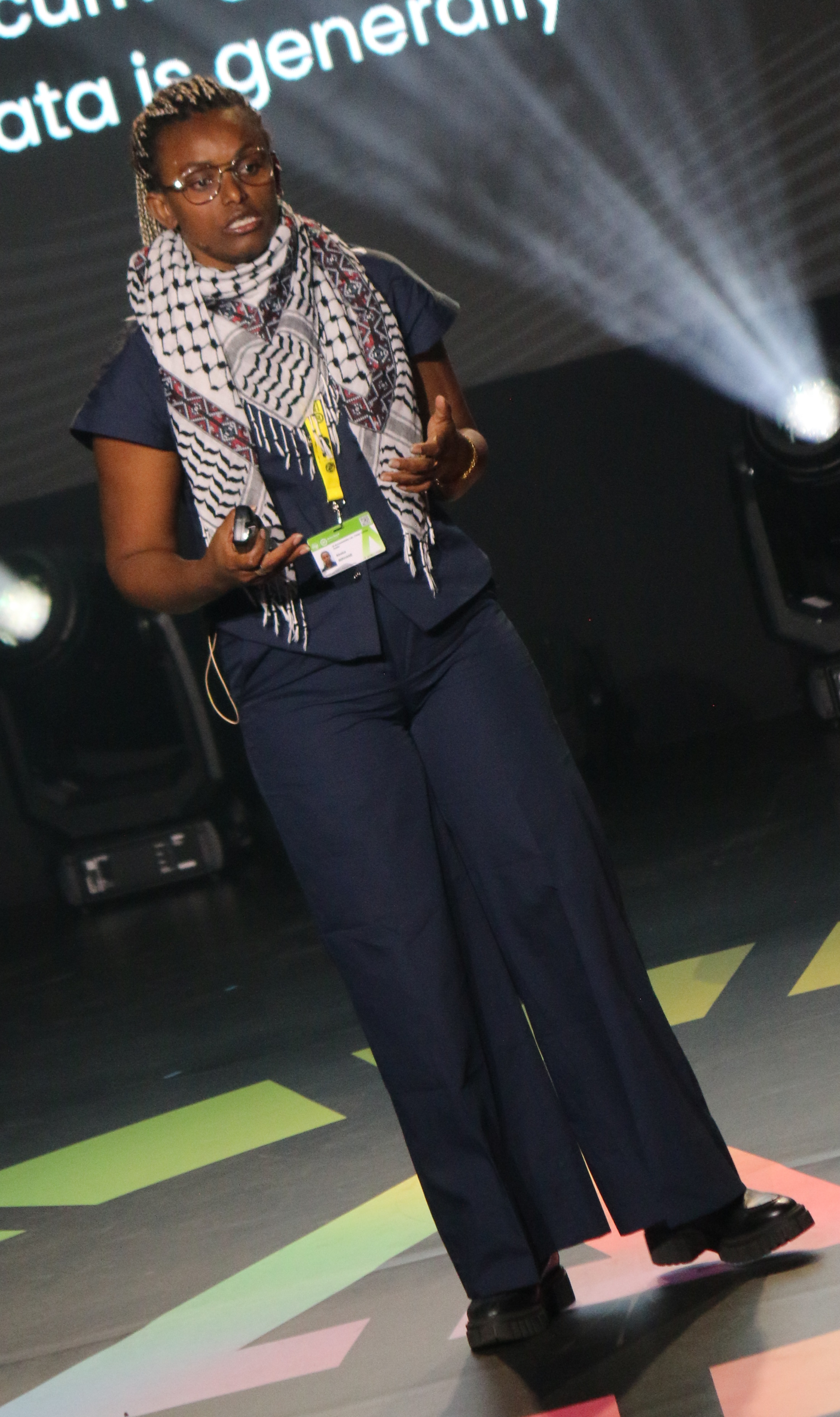
- Birhane at AI for Good (2025)
- Born: Ethiopia
- Education: Bahir Dar University (BSc, BA); University College Dublin (MSc, PhD)
- Known for: Algorithmic bias Critical race theory Computer vision
- Scientific career
- Fields: Cognitive Science; Computer Science
- Workplaces: University College Dublin; Deepmind

Abeba Birhane is an Ethiopian-born cognitive scientist who works at the intersection of complex adaptive systems, machine learning, algorithmic bias, and critical race studies. Birhane's work with Vinay Prabhu uncovered that large-scale image datasets commonly used to develop AI systems, including ImageNet and 80 Million Tiny Images, carried racist and misogynistic labels and offensive images. She has been recognized by VentureBeat as a top innovator in computer vision and named as one of the 100 most influential persons in AI 2023 by TIME magazine.

== Early life and education ==
Birhane was born in Ethiopia. She received her Bachelors of Science in Psychology and a Bachelors of Arts in Philosophy from The Open University. In 2015, she completed her Master of Science in Cognitive Science and, in 2021, her Ph.D. at the Complex Software Lab in the School of Computer Science at University College Dublin.

== Career and research ==
Birhane studied the impacts of emerging AI technologies and how they shape individuals and local communities. She found that AI algorithms tend to disproportionately impact vulnerable groups such as older workers, trans people, immigrants, and children. Her research on relational ethics won the best paper award at NeurIPS’s Black in AI workshop in 2019. She has also studied and written about algorithmic colonization driven by corporate agendas. Her work in decolonizing computational sciences addressed the inherited oppressions in current systems especially towards women of color.

In 2020, Birhane and Vinay Prabhu, principal machine learning scientist at UnifyID, published a paper examining the problematic data collection, labelling, classification, and consequences of large image datasets. These datasets, including ImageNet and MIT's 80 Million Tiny Images, have been used to develop thousands of AI algorithms and systems. Birhane and Prabhu found that they contained many racist and misogynistic labels and slurs as well as offensive images. This resulted in MIT voluntarily and formally taking down the 80 Million Tiny Images dataset.

More recently, Birhane has worked with Rediet Abebe, George Obaido, and Sekou Remy on researching the barriers to data sharing in Africa. They found that power imbalances are significant in the data sharing process, even when the data comes from Africa. Their research was published at the ACM Conference on Fairness, Accountability, and Transparency.

In 2024, Birhane established the AI Accountability Lab research group at Trinity College Dublin.

== Selected awards ==
- 2019 NeurIPS Black in AI Workshop Best Paper Award
- 2020 Venture Beat AI Innovations Award in the category Computer Vision Innovation (received with Vinay Prabhu)
- 2021 100 Brilliant Women in AI Ethics Hall of Fame Honoree
- 2022 Lero Director’s Prize for PhD/PostDoctoral Contribution.
- 2023 100 Most Influential People in AI by TIME magazine
