= Autonomy (disambiguation) =

Autonomy is the capacity of a rational individual to make an informed, un-coerced decision; or, in politics, self-government.

Autonomy may also refer to:

- Autonomy, a 1919 play by Philip Barry
- Autonomy (Eastern Orthodoxy), the status of a hierarchical church
- Autonomy (novel), a 2009 Doctor Who novel by Daniel Blythe
- Autonomy Corporation, a defunct British software company acquired by Hewlett-Packard in 2011
- The Autonomy, a 2009 political coalition in Italy
- Autonomy: The Cover Designs of Anarchy 1961–1970, a 2012 book edited by Daniel Poyner

== Music ==
- Autonomy (album), by Kekal, 2012
- Autonomy (Drenge EP), 2018
- Autonomy, an EP by Zedd, 2011
- "Autonomy", a song by the Buzzcocks from Another Music in a Different Kitchen, 1978

== See also ==
- Autonomic computing, distributed computing resources with self-managing characteristics
- Autonomous (novel), a 2017 novel by Annalee Newitz
- Autonomous area, an area of a country that has a degree of autonomy
- Autonomous category, in mathematics, a special kind of category in which every object has a dual
- Vehicular automation, involves various types of intelligent technological systems to assist a vehicle's operator
  - Autonomous robot, a cybernetic machine that can operate separately from human control
  - Autonomous car, self-steering passenger vehicle
  - Autonomous aircraft, a type of unmanned aerial vehicle
- Autonomous social centers, community centers in which non-authoritarians enact principles of mutual aid
- Learner autonomy, awareness of one's potentials and strategies to take advantage of one's learning context
- Responsible autonomy, a component of triarchy in organizational theory
- Autonomic (disambiguation)
- Autonomous system (disambiguation)
- Autonomí, the name of emergency autoland technology developed by Garmin for their G3000 avionics system
