= John Canny =

Australian computer scientist

John F. Canny
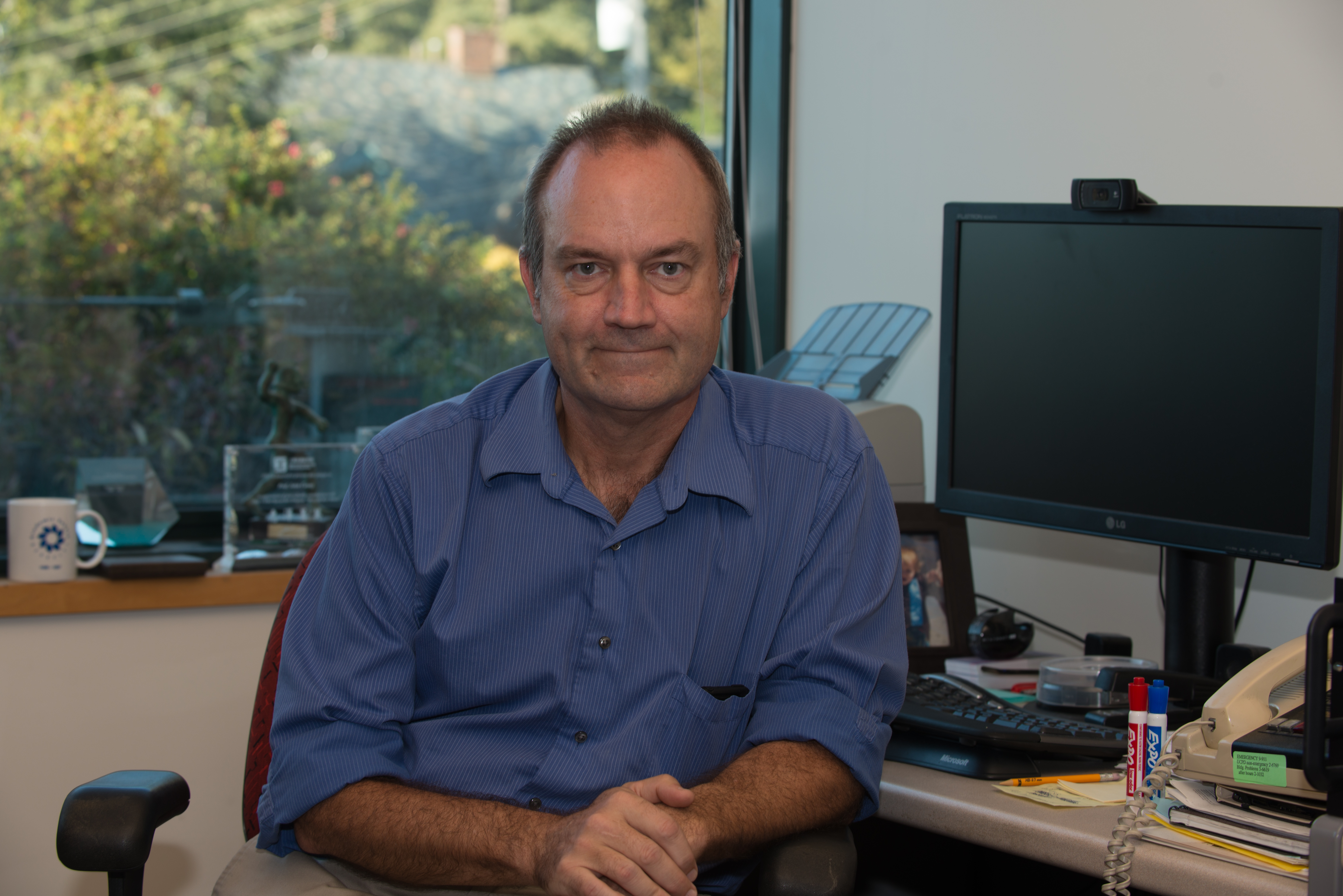
- Canny in 2013
- Education: University of Adelaide; Massachusetts Institute of Technology
- Known for: Canny edge detector
- Awards: Machtey Award
- Scientific career
- Fields: Computer scientist
- Workplaces: Berkeley
- Doctoral students: Ming C. Lin; Dinesh Manocha

John F. Canny (born in 1958) is an Australian computer scientist, and Paul E Jacobs and Stacy Jacobs Distinguished Professor of Engineering in the Computer Science Department of the University of California, Berkeley. He has made significant contributions in various areas of computer science and mathematics, including artificial intelligence, robotics, computer graphics, human-computer interaction, computer security, computational algebra, and computational geometry.

== Biography ==
John Canny received his B.Sc. in computer science and theoretical physics from the University of Adelaide in South Australia, 1979, a B.E. (Hons) in electrical engineering, University of Adelaide, 1980, a M.S. and Ph.D. from the Massachusetts Institute of Technology, 1983 and 1987, respectively.

In 1987, he joined the faculty of Electrical Engineering and Computer Sciences at UC Berkeley.

In 1987, he received the Machtey Award and the ACM Doctoral Dissertation Award. In 1999, he was the co-chair of the Annual Symposium on Computational Geometry. In 2002, he received the American Association for Artificial Intelligence Classic Paper Award for the most influential paper from the 1983 National Conference on Artificial Intelligence. As the author of "A Variational Approach to Edge Detection" and the creator of the widely used Canny edge detector, he was honored for seminal contributions in the areas of robotics and machine perception.

== See also ==
- Canny edge detector
- Existential theory of the reals
- Kinodynamic planning

== Publications ==
Canny has published several books, papers and articles. A selection:

- 1986. A computational approach to edge detection. IEEE Transactions on Pattern Analysis and Machine Intelligence, vol. 8, 1986, pp. 679–698.
- 1988. The Complexity of Robot Motion Planning. The ACM Distinguished Dissertation Series, Cambridge, MA: The MIT Press, 1988.
- 1993. "An opportunistic global path planner". With M. C. Lin. In: Algorithmica vol. 10, no. 2–4, pp. 102–120, Aug. 1993.
- 2007. "MultiView: Improving trust in group video conferencing through spatial faithfulness" (Best Paper Prize). With D. T. Nguyen In: Proc. 2007 SIGCHI Conf. on Human Factors in Computing Systems (CHI '07), New York, NY: The Association for Computing Machinery, Inc., 2007, pp. 1465–1474.
