= MNIST database =

Database of handwritten digits

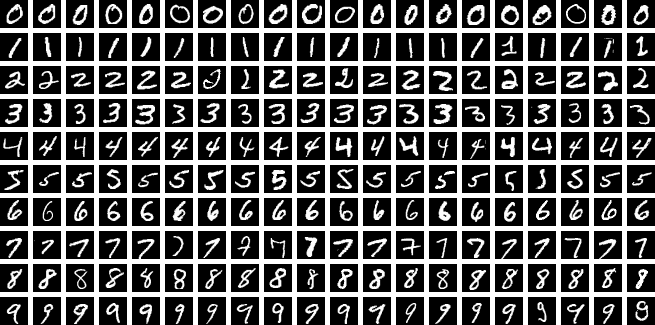
Sample images from MNIST test dataset

The MNIST database (Modified National Institute of Standards and Technology database) is a large database of handwritten digits that is commonly used for training various image processing systems. The database is also widely used for training and testing in the field of machine learning. It was created by "re-mixing" the samples from NIST's original datasets. The creators felt that since NIST's training dataset was taken from American Census Bureau employees, while the testing dataset was taken from American high school students, it was not well-suited for machine learning experiments. Furthermore, the black and white images from NIST were normalized to fit into a 28x28 pixel bounding box and anti-aliased, which introduced grayscale levels.

The MNIST database contains 60,000 training images and 10,000 testing images. Half of the training set and half of the test set were taken from NIST's training dataset, while the other half of the training set and the other half of the test set were taken from NIST's testing dataset. The original creators of the database keep a list of some of the methods tested on it. In their original paper, they use a support-vector machine to get an error rate of 0.8%.

The original MNIST dataset contains at least 4 wrong labels.

== History ==
=== USPS database ===
In 1988, a dataset of digits from the US Postal Service was constructed. It contained 16×16 grayscale images digitized from handwritten zip codes that appeared on U.S. mail passing through the Buffalo, New York post office. The training set had 7291 images, and test set had 2007, making a total of 9298. Both training and test set contained ambiguous, unclassifiable, and misclassified data. The dataset was used to train and benchmark the 1989 LeNet.

The task is rather difficult. On the test set, two humans made errors at an average rate of 2.5%.

=== Special Database ===
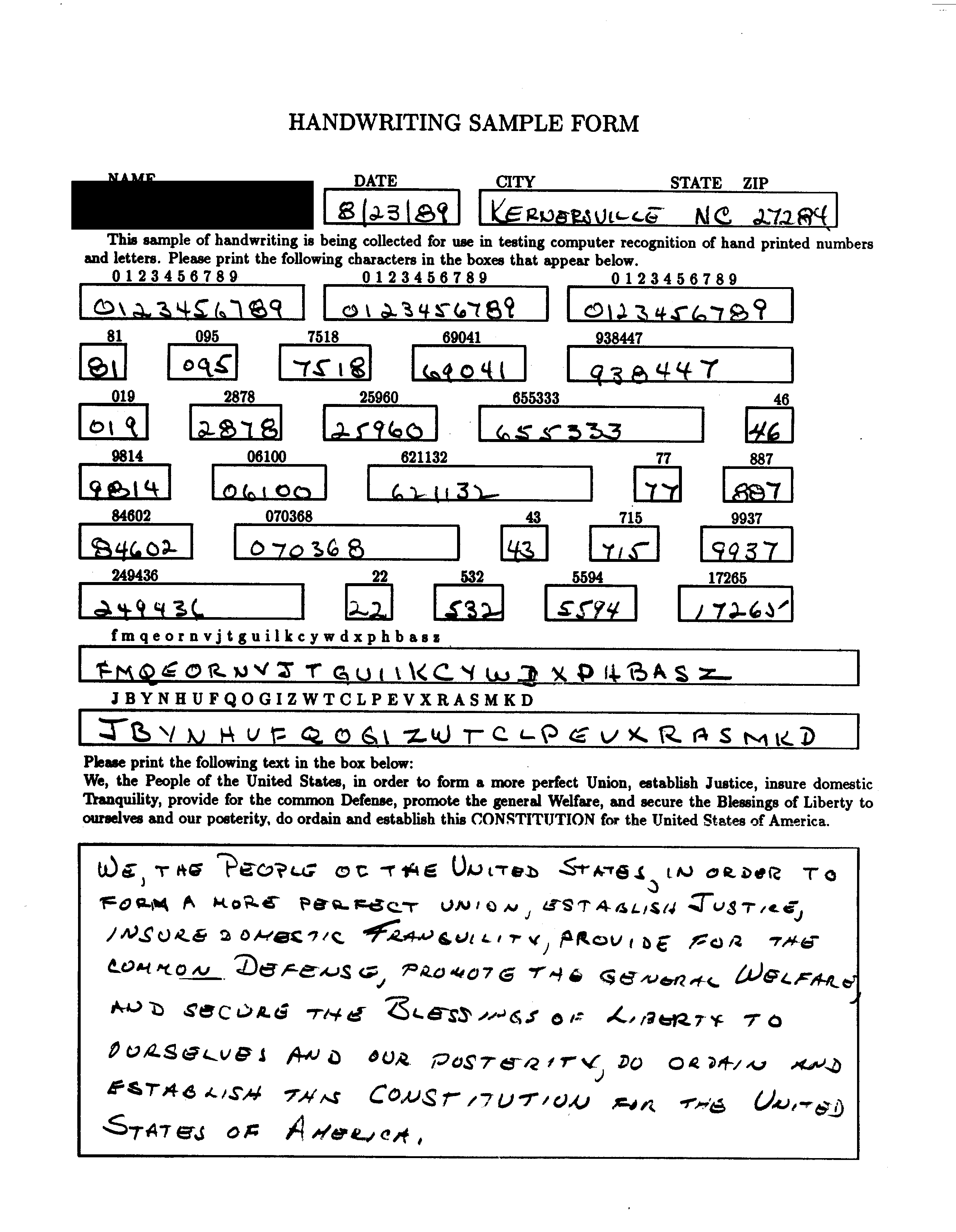
An example HSF. This is from NIST Special Database 19, with filename f1002_33.png.

In the late 1980s, the Census Bureau was interested in automatic digitization of handwritten census forms, so it enlisted the Image Recognition Group (IRG) at NIST to evaluate OCR systems. Several years of work resulted in several "Special Databases" and benchmarks. Of particular importance to MNIST are Special Database 1 (SD-1), released in May 1990, Special Database 3 (SD-3), released in February 1992, and Special Database 7 (SD-7), or NIST Test Data 1 (TD-1), released in April 1992. They were released on ISO-9660 CD-ROMs. They were obtained by asking people to write on "Handwriting Sample Forms" (HSFs), then digitizing the HSFs, then segmenting out the alphanumerical characters. Each writer wrote a single HSF.

Each HSF contains multiple entry fields, wherein people were asked to write. There are 34 fields: name and date entries, a city/state field, 28 digit fields, one upper-case field, one lower-case field, and an unconstrained Constitution text paragraph. Each HSF was scanned at resolution 300 dots per inch (11.8 dots per millimeter).

SD-1 and SD-3 were constructed from the same set of HSFs by 2100 out of 3400 permanent census field workers as part of the 1990 United States census. SD-1 contained the segmented data entry fields, but not the segmented alphanumericals. SD-3 contained binary 128×128 images digitized from segmented alphanumericals, with 223,125 digits, 44,951 upper-case letters, and 45,313 lower case letters.

SD-7 or TD-1 was the test set, and it contained 58,646 128×128 binary images written by 500 high school students in Bethesda, Maryland. They were described as "math and science students in a high school as a short exercise during class". Each image is accompanied by a unique integer ID for the identity of its writer. SD-7 was released without labels on CD-ROMs, and the labels were later released on floppy drives. It did not contain the HSFs. SD-7 was difficult enough that the human error rate on it was 1.5%.

SD-3 was much cleaner and easier to recognize than images in SD-7. The European crossed seven (~~7~~) is far more abundant in SD-7 than in SD-3. It was suspected that SD-3 was produced by people more motivated than those who produced SD-7. Also, the character segmenter for SD-3 was an older design than that of SD-7, and failed more often. It was suspected that the harder instances were filtered out of the construction of SD-3, since the hard instances failed to even pass the segmenter. It was found that machine learning systems trained and validated on SD-3 suffered significant drops in performance on SD-7, from an error rate of less than 1% to ~10%.

In 1992, NIST and the Census Bureau sponsored a competition and a conference to determine the state of the art in this industry. In the competition, teams were given SD-3 as the training set before March 23, SD-7 as the test set before April 13, and would submit one or more systems for classifying SD-7 before April 27. A total of 45 algorithms were submitted from 26 companies from 7 different countries. On May 27 and 28, all parties that submitted results convened in Gaithersburg, Maryland at the First Census OCR Systems Conference. Observers from FBI, IRS, and USPS were in attendance. The winning entry did not use SD-3 for training, but a much larger proprietary training set, thus was not affected by the distribution shift. Among the 25 entries that did use SD-3 for training, the winning entry was a nearest-neighbor classifier using a handcrafted metric that is invariant to Euclidean transforms.

SD-19 was published in 1995, as a compilation of SD-1, SD-3, SD-7 and some further data. It contained 814,255 binary images of alphanumericals and binary images of 4169 HSFs, including those 500 HSFs that were used to generate SD-7. It was updated in 2016.

=== MNIST ===
The MNIST was constructed sometime before summer 1994. It was constructed by mixing 128x128 binary images from SD-3 and SD-7. Specifically, they first took all images from SD-7 and divided them into a training set and a test set, each from 250 writers. This resulted in nearly 30000 images in each set. They then added more images from SD-3 until each set contained exactly 60000 images.

Each image was size-normalized to fit in a 20x20 pixel box while preserving their aspect ratio, and anti-aliased to grayscale. Then it was put into a 28x28 image by translating it until the center of mass of the pixels is in the center of the image. The details of how the downsampling proceeded was reconstructed.

The training set and the test set both originally had 60k samples, but 50k of the test set samples were discarded, and only the samples indexed 24476 to 34475 were used, giving just 10k samples in the test set.

=== Further versions ===
In 2019, the full 60k test set from MNIST was restored to construct the QMNIST, which has 60k images in the training set and 60k in the test set.

Extended MNIST (EMNIST) is a newer dataset developed and released by NIST to be the (final) successor to MNIST, released in 2017. MNIST included images only of handwritten digits. EMNIST was constructed from all the images from SD-19, converted into the same 28x28 pixel format, by the same process, as were the MNIST images. Accordingly, tools which work with MNIST would likely work unmodified with EMNIST.

Fashion MNIST was created in 2017 as a more challenging alternative for MNIST. The dataset consists of 70,000 28x28 grayscale images of fashion products from 10 categories.

== Performance ==
Some researchers have achieved "near-human performance" on the MNIST database, using a committee of neural networks; in the same paper, the authors achieve performance double that of humans on other recognition tasks. The highest error rate listed on the original website of the database is 12 percent, which is achieved using a simple linear classifier with no preprocessing.

In 2004, a best-case error rate of 0.42 percent was achieved on the database by researchers using a new classifier called the LIRA, which is a neural classifier with three neuron layers based on Rosenblatt's perceptron principles.

Some studies have used data augmentation to increase the training data set size and thereby performance. The systems in these cases are usually neural networks and the distortions used tend to be either affine distortions or elastic distortions. Sometimes, these systems can be very successful; one such system achieved an error rate on the database of 0.39 percent.

In 2011, an error rate of 0.27 percent, improving on the previous best result, was reported by researchers using a similar system of neural networks. In 2013, an approach based on regularization of neural networks using DropConnect has been claimed to achieve a 0.21 percent error rate. In 2016, the single convolutional neural network best performance was 0.25 percent error rate. As of August 2018, the best performance of a single convolutional neural network trained on MNIST training data using no data augmentation is 0.25 percent error rate. Also, the Parallel Computing Center (Khmelnytskyi, Ukraine) obtained an ensemble of only 5 convolutional neural networks which performs on MNIST at 0.21 percent error rate.

== Classifiers ==
This is a table of some of the machine learning methods used on the dataset and their error rates, by type of classifier:

Type	Classifier	Data augmentation	Preprocessing	Error rate (%)
Linear classifier	Pairwise linear classifier	Affine transformation	Deskewing	7.6
K-Nearest Neighbors	K-NN with rigid transformations	?	None	0.96
K-Nearest Neighbors	K-NN with non-linear deformation (P2DHMDM)	?	Shiftable edges	0.52
Boosted Stumps	Product of stumps on Haar features	?	Haar features	0.87
Non-linear classifier	40 PCA + quadratic classifier	Affine transformation	None	3.3
Random Forest	Fast Unified Random Forests for Survival, Regression, and Classification (RF-SRC)	?	Simple statistical pixel importance	2.8
Support-vector machine (SVM)	Virtual SVM, deg-9 poly, 2-pixel jittered	?	Deskewing	0.56
Multilayer perceptron (MLP)	2-layer 784-800-10	None	None	1.6
Multilayer perceptron (MLP)	2-layer 784-800-10	Affine transformation	None	1.1
Multilayer perceptron (MLP)	2-layer 784-800-10	Elastic distortion	None	0.7
Multilayer perceptron (MLP)	3-layer 784-1000-500-10	Elastic distortion and affine transformation	None	0.49
Multilayer perceptron (MLP)	6-layer 784-2500-2000-1500-1000-500-10	Elastic distortion and affine transformation	None	0.35
Vision transformer (ViT)	16-layer 4-head 4-patch	Affine transformation	None	1.06
Vision transformer (ViT)	9-layer 28-head 7-patch	Affine transformation	None	0.35
Convolutional neural network (CNN)	6-layer 784-40-80-500-1000-2000-10	Yes	None	0.31
Convolutional neural network (CNN)	6-layer 784-50-100-500-1000-10-10	Yes	None	0.27
Convolutional neural network (CNN)	13-layer 64-128(5x)-256(3x)-512-2048-256-256-10	None	None	0.25
Convolutional neural network (CNN)	Committee of 35 CNNs, 1-20-P-40-P-150-10	Elastic distortion	Width normalizations	0.23
Convolutional neural network (CNN)	Committee of 5 CNNs, 6-layer 784-50-100-500-1000-10-10	Yes	None	0.21
Convolutional neural network (CNN)	Committee of 20 CNNS with Squeeze-and-Excitation Networks	Yes	None	0.17
Convolutional neural network (CNN)	Ensemble of 3 CNNs with varying kernel sizes	Rotation and translation	None	0.09

== See also ==
- List of datasets for machine learning research
- Caltech 101
- LabelMe
- OCR
