= Autonomous system =

Autonomous system may refer to:

- Autonomous system (Internet), a collection of IP networks and routers under the control of one entity
- Autonomous system (mathematics), a system of ordinary differential equations which does not depend on the independent variable
- Autonomous robot, robots which can perform desired tasks in unstructured environments without continuous human guidance
- Autonomous underwater vehicle, a system that travels underwater without requiring input from an operator.
