= Alfred Marcel Bruckstein =

Romanian scientist and emeritus professor

Alfred M. Bruckstein FSIAM FAAIA FIEEE FCAcad
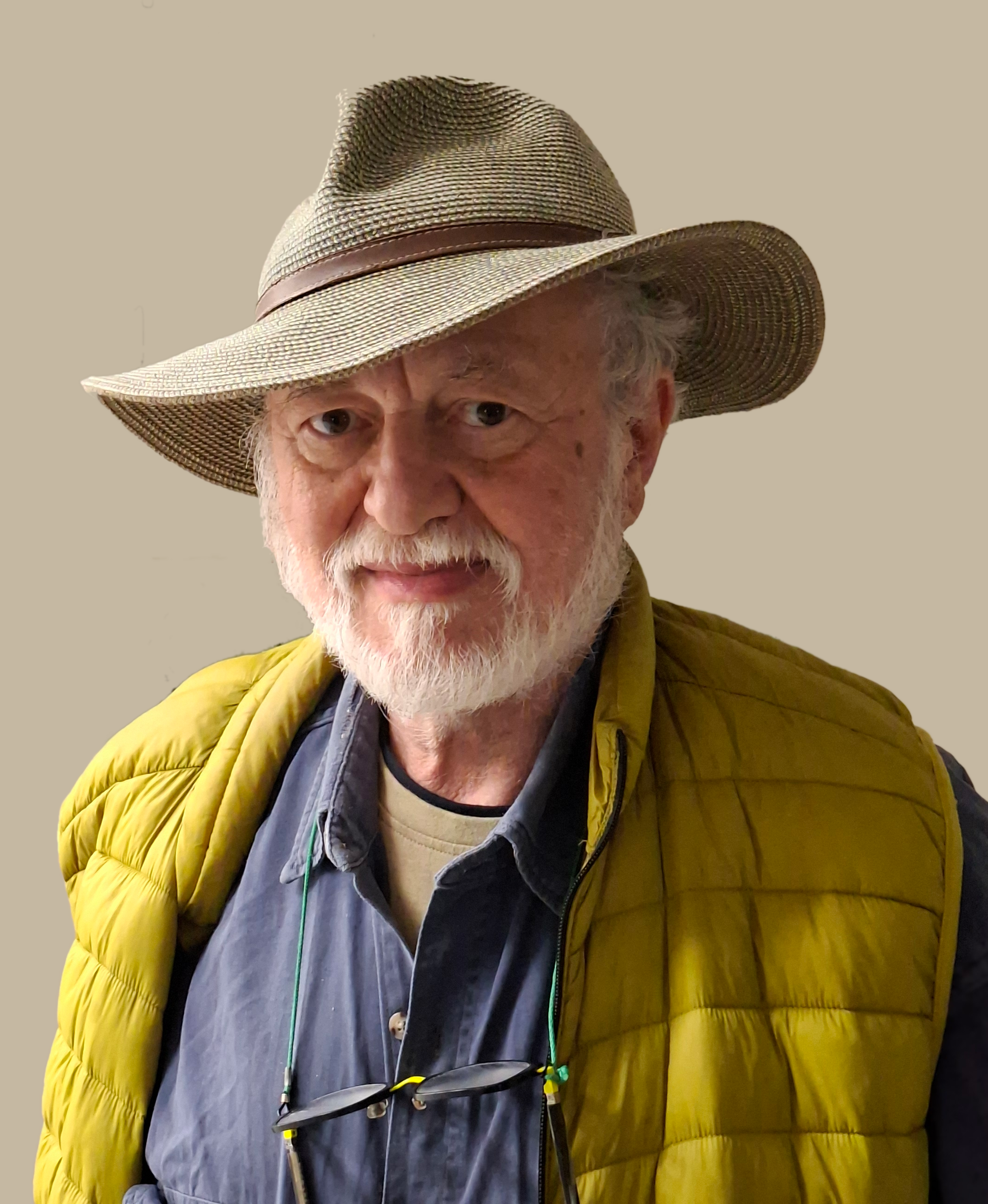
- Bruckstein in April 2026
- Born: 24 January 1954 (age 72); Sighet, Romania
- Education: Technion; Stanford University
- Father: Ludovic Bruckstein
- Awards: SIAM fellow 2014; AAIA fellow 2023; IEEE fellow 2023; CORE Academy Fellow 2024
- Scientific career
- Fields: Mathematics, Signal Processing, Computer science
- Workplaces: Technion; Nanyang Technological University
- Doctoral advisor: Thomas Kailath
- Doctoral students: Guillermo Sapiro, Ron Kimmel, Yaniv Altshuler

Alfred Marcel Bruckstein (born January 24, 1954) is a scientist, an emeritus professor at the Technion., and a visiting professor at Nanyang Technological University. In 2014 Bruckstein was recognized as a SIAM fellow for contributions to signal processing, image analysis, and ant robotics, in 2023 he was elected an Asia-Pacific Artificial Intelligence Association (AAIA) fellow and IEEE fellow for contributions to signal representations and swarm robotics, in 2024 he became an elected fellow of the International Core Academy of Sciences and Humanities.

== Academic career ==
Bruckstein began his studies at the Technion faculty of Electrical Engineering, where he received his B.Sc. in 1976 and M.Sc. in 1981 . He continued his studies at Stanford University under the guidance of Thomas Kailath, receiving his Ph.D in 1984, after which he returned to the Technion. At the Technion he was bestowed with the Franz Ollendorff chair of science and has served in a range of positions, including dean of the graduate school (2002–2005) and head of the excellence program (2006–2011) . Bruckstein has written over 300 scientific papers and contributed to nine US patents Bruckstein's research topics include sparse representations, various aspects of computer vision, pattern recognition, image registration, fiducial design, and ant robotics.

== Awards ==
- 2014 SIAM Activity Group on Imaging Science Best Paper Prize, along with David L. Donoho and Michael Elad for their paper titled "From Sparse Solutions of Systems of Equations to Sparse Modeling of Signals and Images".
- 2018 IEEE Signal Processing Society Sustained Impact Paper Award with Michal Aharon and Michael Elad for their paper titled "The K-SVD: An Algorithm for Designing of Overcomplete Dictionaries for Sparse Representation".
- Doctor Honoris Causa of Agora University, Oradea, Romania, 2018.

== Publications ==
=== Signal Processing ===
- Bruckstein, A.M. (1987), "On optimal image digitization", IEEE Transactions on Acoustics, Speech, and Signal Processing, 35 (4): 553–555, Bibcode:1987ITASS..35..553B, doi:10.1109/TASSP.1987.1165148
- Bruckstein, A.M. (1987), "On 'Soft' bit allocation", IEEE Transactions on Acoustics, Speech, and Signal Processing, 35 (5): 614–617, Bibcode:1987ITASS..35..614B, doi:10.1109/TASSP.1987.1165184
- Bruckstein, A.M.; Kailath, T. (1987), "An inverse scattering framework for several problems in signal processing", IEEE ASSP Magazine, 4 (1): 6–20, Bibcode:1987IASSP...4....6B, doi:10.1109/MASSP.1987.1165567
- Bruckstein, A.M.; Elad, M.; Kimmel, R. (2003), "Down-scaling for better transform compression", IEEE Transactions on Image Processing, 12 (9): 1132–1144, Bibcode:2003ITIP...12.1132B, doi:10.1109/TIP.2003.816023, PMID 18237984

=== Computer Vision ===
- Bruckstein, A.M. (1988), "On shape from shading", Computer Vision, Graphics, and Image Processing, 44 (2): 139–154, doi:10.1016/S0734-189X(88)80002-1, ISSN 0734-189X
- Kiryati, N.; Eldar, Y.; Bruckstein, A.M. (1991), "A probabilistic Hough transform", Pattern Recognition, 24 (4): 303–316, Bibcode:1991PatRe..24..303K, doi:10.1016/0031-3203(91)90073-E, ISSN 0031-3203
- Lindenbaum, M.; Bruckstein, A.M. (1994), "Blind approximation of planar convex sets", IEEE Transactions on Robotics and Automation, 10 (4): 517–529, Bibcode:1994ITRA...10..517L, doi:10.1109/70.313101
- Kimmel, R.; Bruckstein, A.M. (1995), "Tracking Level Sets by Level Sets: A Method for Solving the Shape from Shading Problem", Computer Vision and Image Understanding, 62 (1): 47–58, doi:10.1006/cviu.1995.1040, ISSN 1077-3142

=== Ant Robotics ===
- Bruckstein, A.M. (1993), "Why the ant trails look so straight and nice", The Mathematical Intelligencer, 15 (2): 59–62, doi:10.1007/BF03024195, ISSN 0343-6993
- Yanovski, V.; Wagner, I.A.; Bruckstein, A.M. (2003), "A Distributed Ant Algorithm for Efficiently Patrolling a Network", Algorithmica, 37 (3): 165–186, doi:10.1007/s00453-003-1030-9, ISSN 1432-0541
- Altshuler, Y.; Pentland, A.; Bruckstein, A.M. (2018). Swarms and network intelligence in search. Studies in Computational Intelligence. Vol. 729. Cham, Switzerland: Springer. p. IX, 238. doi:10.1007/978-3-319-63604-7. ISBN 978-3-319-63602-3. ISSN 1860-949X.

=== Image Registration ===
- Bruckstein, A.M.; O'Gorman, L.; Orlitsky, A. (1998), "Design of shapes for precise image registration", IEEE Transactions on Information Theory, 44 (7): 3156–3162, Bibcode:1998ITIT...44.3156B, doi:10.1109/18.737548
- Bruckstein, A.M.; Holt, R.J.; Netravali, A.N. (1998), "Holographic representations of images", IEEE Transactions on Image Processing, 7 (11): 1583–1597, Bibcode:1998ITIP....7.1583B, doi:10.1109/83.725365, PMID 18276223
- Bruckstein, A.M.; Holt, R.J.; Huang, T.S.; Netravali, A.N. (2001), "Trifocal tensors for weak perspective and paraperspective projections", Pattern Recognition, 34 (2): 395–404, Bibcode:2001PatRe..34..395B, doi:10.1016/S0031-3203(99)00228-9, ISSN 0031-3203
- Adel, M.; Ghinovker, M.; Golovanevsky, B.; Izikson, P.; Kassel, E.; Yaffe, D.; Bruckstein, A.M.; Goldenberg, R.; Rubner, Y.; Rudzsky, M. (2004), "Optimized overlay metrology marks: theory and experiment", IEEE Transactions on Semiconductor Manufacturing, 17 (2): 166–179, Bibcode:2004ITSM...17..166A, doi:10.1109/TSM.2004.826955

=== Sparse Representation ===
- Aharon, M.; Elad, M.; Bruckstein, A.M. (2006), "The K-SVD: An Algorithm for Designing of Overcomplete Dictionaries for Sparse Representation", IEEE Transactions on Signal Processing, 11 (54): 4311–4322, Bibcode:2006ITSP...54.4311A, doi:10.1109/TSP.2006.881199, S2CID 7477309
- Bruckstein, A.M.; Donoho, D.L.; Elad, M. (2009), "From Sparse Solutions of Systems of Equations to Sparse Modeling of Signals and Images", SIAM Review, 51 (1): 34–81, Bibcode:2009SIAMR..51...34B, doi:10.1137/060657704
- Vainsencher, D.; Mannor, S.; Bruckstein, A.M. (2011), "The Sample Complexity of Dictionary Learning", Journal of Machine Learning Research, 12 (100): 3259–3281
