= Babel function =

In signal processing and mathematics, the Babel function, also known as cumulative coherence function (CCF), measures the maximum combined similarity between one fixed building block (called an atom) and a group of other building blocks within a collection (called a dictionary).

Introduced by Joel Tropp as an extension of mutual coherence—which compares similarity between pairs of dictionary columns—the Babel function broadens this idea to assess how one column relates to multiple others at once, making it a key tool for analyzing sparse representations of signals. It applies to scenarios where signals can be efficiently described using a redundant dictionary matrix, a set of overlapping components used in areas like audio processing and data compression.

== Definition and formulation ==
The Babel function of a dictionary $\boldsymbol{A}$ with normalized columns is a real-valued function that is defined as

$$\mu_1(p) = \max_{ |\lambda| = p} \{ \max_{j\notin \lambda} \{   \sum_{i\in\lambda}  {|\boldsymbol{a}_i^{\boldsymbol{T}}\boldsymbol{a}_j|} \} \}$$

where $\boldsymbol{a}_k$ are the columns (atoms) of the dictionary $\boldsymbol{A}$.

== Special case ==
When p=1, the Babel function is the mutual coherence.

== Practical Applications ==
Li and Lin have used the Babel function to aid in creating effective dictionaries for machine learning applications.

== See also ==
- Compressed sensing
- Mutual coherence (linear algebra)
