= Elad (disambiguation) =

El'ad is a city in the Center District of Israel.

Elad may also refer to:

In organizations:

- El-Ad Group, a real estate development conglomerate based in Israel
  - Elad Properties, its New York City-based subsidiary
- El'ad Association or Ir David Foundation, an Israeli archaeology, tourism and settlement organization

In people:

- Elad Gabai (born 1985), Israeli footballer
- Elad Lassry (born 1977), American artist
- Elad Peled (1927–2021), Israeli general
- Michael Elad (born 1963), Israeli engineer

== See also ==
- Ellada, transliteration of the Greek name for the country of Greece in Southern Europe
