= Basis expansion time-frequency analysis =

Time-frequency analysis

Linear expansions in a single basis, whether it is a Fourier series, wavelet, or any other basis, are not suitable enough. A Fourier basis provided a poor representation of functions well localized in time, and wavelet bases are not well adapted to represent functions whose Fourier transforms have a narrow high frequency support. In both cases, it is difficult to detect and identify the signal patterns from their expansion coefficients, because the information is diluted across the whole basis. Therefore, we must use large amounts of Fourier basis or Wavelets to represent whole signal with small approximation error. Some matching pursuit algorithms are proposed in reference papers to minimize approximation error when given the amount of basis.

== Properties ==
For Fourier series

$$x(t) \approx \sum_{m=1}^M a_m \cdot e^{j 2\pi mt/T}$$

$$a_m=\int_0^T x(t)e^{-j 2\pi mt/T} \, \mathrm{d}t$$

Some time-frequency analysis are also attempt to represent signal as the form below

$$x(t) \approx \sum_{m=1}^M a_m\cdot \varphi_m(t)$$

when given the amount of basis M, minimize approximation error in mean-square sense

$$\text{approximation error} = \int_{- \infty}^\infty |x(t)-\sum_{m=1}^M a_m \cdot \varphi_m(t)|^2\, \mathrm{d}t$$

== Examples ==
=== Three-parameter atoms ===
$$x(t) \approx \sum a_{t_0,f_0,\sigma}\cdot \varphi_{t_0,f_0,\sigma}(t)$$

$$\varphi_{t_0,f_0,\sigma}(t)=\frac{2^{0.25}}{\sigma^{0.5}}e^{j2\pi f_0 t- \pi (t-t_0)^2/\sigma^2}$$

Since $\varphi_{t_0,f_0,\sigma}(t)\quad$ are not orthogonal,$\quad a_{t_0,f_0,\sigma}\quad$ should be determined by a matching pursuit process.

Three parameters:

$t_0$ controls the central time.

$f_0$ controls the central frequency.

$\sigma$ controls the scaling factor.

=== Four-parameter atoms (chirplet) ===
$$x(t) \approx \sum a_{t_0,f_0,\sigma,\eta}\cdot \varphi_{t_0,f_0,\sigma,\eta}(t)$$

$$\varphi_{t_0,f_0,\sigma,\eta}(t)=\frac{2^{0.25}}{\sigma^{0.5}} e^{j2\pi (f_0 t+\eta/2 t^2)- \pi (t-t_0)^2/\sigma^2}$$

Four parameters:

$t_0$ controls the central time

$f_0$ controls the central frequency

$\sigma$ controls the scaling factor

$\eta$ controls the chirp rate

==== Short-time Fourier transform of different basis ====
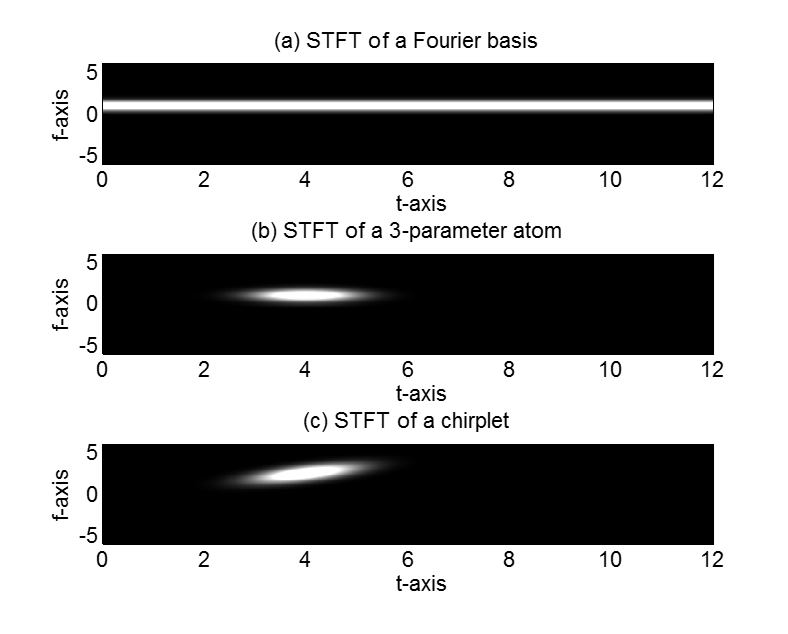
