= Michal Aharon =

Israeli computer scientist

- מיכל אהרון
- Education: Technion – Israel Institute of Technology
- Occupation: Computer scientist at Yahoo!

Michal Aharon (Hebrew: מיכל אהרון) is an Israeli computer scientist known for her research on sparse dictionary learning, image denoising, and the K-SVD algorithm in machine learning. She is a researcher on advertisement ranking for Yahoo! in Haifa.

== Education and career ==
Aharon was a student at the Technion – Israel Institute of Technology, earning bachelor's and master's degrees there in 2001 and 2004, and completing her Ph.D. in 2006. Her dissertation, Learning Dictionaries for Sparse Representations, was supervised by Michael Elad.

After working for HP Labs in Haifa, Aharon moved to Yahoo! Labs in 2011. In 2014, she became head of the Yahoo! ad ranking science team, which develops algorithms for advertisement selection for Yahoo! Native.
