= Nullspace property =

In compressed sensing, the nullspace property gives necessary and sufficient conditions on the reconstruction of sparse signals using the techniques of $\ell_1$-relaxation. The term "nullspace property" originates from Cohen, Dahmen, and DeVore. The nullspace property is often difficult to check in practice, and the restricted isometry property is a more modern condition in the field of compressed sensing.

== The technique of $\ell_1$-relaxation ==
The non-convex $\ell_0$-minimization problem,

$\min\limits_{x} \|x\|_0$ subject to $Ax = b$,

is a standard problem in compressed sensing. However, $\ell_0$-minimization is known to be NP-hard in general. As such, the technique of $\ell_1$-relaxation is sometimes employed to circumvent the difficulties of signal reconstruction using the $\ell_0$-norm. In $\ell_1$-relaxation, the $\ell_1$ problem,

$\min\limits_{x} \|x\|_1$ subject to $Ax = b$,

is solved in place of the $\ell_0$ problem. Note that this relaxation is convex and hence amenable to the standard techniques of linear programming - a computationally desirable feature. Naturally we wish to know when $\ell_1$-relaxation will give the same answer as the $\ell_0$ problem. The nullspace property is one way to guarantee agreement.

== Definition ==
An $m \times n$ complex matrix $A$ has the nullspace property of order $s$, if for all index sets $S$ with $s=|S| \leq n$ we have that: $\|\eta_S\|_1 < \|\eta_{S^C}\|_1$ for all $\eta \in \ker{A} \setminus \left\{0\right\}$.

== Recovery Condition ==
The following theorem gives necessary and sufficient condition on the recoverability of a given $s$-sparse vector in $\mathbb{C}^n$. The proof of the theorem is a standard one, and the proof supplied here is summarized from Holger Rauhut.

$\textbf{Theorem:}$ Let $A$ be a $m \times n$ complex matrix. Then every $s$-sparse signal $x \in \mathbb{C}^n$ is the unique solution to the $\ell_1$-relaxation problem with $b = Ax$ if and only if $A$ satisfies the nullspace property with order $s$.

$\textit{Proof:}$ For the forwards direction notice that $\eta_S$ and $-\eta_{S^C}$ are distinct vectors with $A(-\eta_{S^C}) = A(\eta_S)$ by the linearity of $A$, and hence by uniqueness we must have $\|\eta_S\|_1 < \|\eta_{S^C}\|_1$ as desired. For the backwards direction, let $x$ be $s$-sparse and $z$ another (not necessary $s$-sparse) vector such that $z \neq x$ and $Az = Ax$. Define the (non-zero) vector $\eta = x - z$ and notice that it lies in the nullspace of $A$. Call $S$ the support of $x$, and then the result follows from an elementary application of the triangle inequality: $\|x\|_1 \leq \|x - z_S\|_1 + \|z_S\|_1 = \|\eta_S\|_1+\|z_S\|_1 < \|\eta_{S^C}\|_1+\|z_S\|_1 = \|-z_{S^C}\|_1+\|z_S\|_1 = \|z\|_1$, establishing the minimality of $x$. $\square$
