= Basis pursuit =

Optimization problem

Basis pursuit is the mathematical optimization problem of the form

$$\min_x \|x\|_1 \quad \text{subject to} \quad y = Ax,$$

where x is a N-dimensional solution vector (signal), y is a M-dimensional vector of observations (measurements), A is a M × N transform matrix (usually measurement matrix) and M < N. The version of basis pursuit that seeks to minimize the L_{0} norm is NP-hard.

It is usually applied in cases where there is an underdetermined system of linear equations y = Ax that must be exactly satisfied, and the sparsest solution in the L_{1} sense is desired.

When it is desirable to trade off exact equality of Ax and y in exchange for a sparser x, basis pursuit denoising is preferred.

Basis pursuit problems can be converted to linear programming problems in polynomial time and vice versa, making the two types of problems polynomially equivalent.

== Equivalence to Linear Programming ==
A basis pursuit problem can be converted to a linear programming problem by first noting that

$$\begin{align} \|x\|_1 &= |x_1| + |x_2| + \ldots + |x_n| \\ &= (x_1^+ + x_1^-) + (x_2^+ + x_2^-) + \ldots + (x_n^+ + x_n^-)\end{align}$$

where $x_i^+, x_i^- \geq 0$. This construction is derived from the constraint $x_i = x_i^+ - x_i^-$, where the value of $|x_i|$ is intended to be stored in $x_i^+$ or $x_i^-$ depending on whether $x_i$ is greater or less than zero, respectively. Although a range of $x_i^+$ and $x_i^-$ values can potentially satisfy this constraint, solvers using the simplex algorithm will find solutions where one or both of $x_i^+$ or $x_i^-$ is zero, resulting in the relation $|x_i| = (x_i^+ + x_i^-)$.

From this expansion, the problem can be recast in canonical form as:

$$\begin{align}
& \text{Find a vector} && (\mathbf{x^+}, \mathbf{x^-}) \\
& \text{that minimizes}   && \mathbf{1}^T \mathbf{x^+} + \mathbf{1}^T \mathbf{x^-} \\
& \text{subject to} && A \mathbf{x^+} - A \mathbf{x^-} = \mathbf{y} \\
& \text{and} && \mathbf{x^+}, \mathbf{x^-} \geq \mathbf{0}.
\end{align}$$

== See also ==
- Basis pursuit denoising
- Compressed sensing
- Frequency spectrum
- Group testing
- Lasso (statistics)
- Least-squares spectral analysis
- Matching pursuit
- Sparse approximation

== References & further reading ==
- Stephen Boyd, Lieven Vandenbergh: Convex Optimization, Cambridge University Press, 2004, ISBN 9780521833783, pp. 337–337
- Simon Foucart, Holger Rauhut: A Mathematical Introduction to Compressive Sensing. Springer, 2013, ISBN 9780817649487, pp. 77–110
