= Sparse dictionary learning =

Representation learning method

Sparse dictionary learning (also known as sparse coding or SDL) is a representation learning method which aims to find a sparse representation of the input data in the form of a linear combination of basic elements as well as those basic elements themselves. These elements are called atoms, and they compose a dictionary. Atoms in the dictionary are not required to be orthogonal, and they may be an over-complete spanning set. This problem setup also allows the dimensionality of the signals being represented to be higher than any one of the signals being observed. These two properties lead to having seemingly redundant atoms that allow multiple representations of the same signal, but also provide an improvement in sparsity and flexibility of the representation.

One of the most important applications of sparse dictionary learning is in the field of compressed sensing or signal recovery. In compressed sensing, a high-dimensional signal can be recovered with only a few linear measurements, provided that the signal is sparse or near-sparse. Since not all signals satisfy this condition, it is crucial to find a sparse representation of that signal such as the wavelet transform or the directional gradient of a rasterized matrix. Once a matrix or a high-dimensional vector is transferred to a sparse space, different recovery algorithms like basis pursuit, CoSaMP, or fast non-iterative algorithms can be used to recover the signal.

One of the key principles of dictionary learning is that the dictionary has to be inferred from the input data. The emergence of sparse dictionary learning methods was stimulated by the fact that in signal processing, one typically wants to represent the input data using a minimal amount of components. Before this approach, the general practice was to use predefined dictionaries such as Fourier or wavelet transforms. However, in certain cases, a dictionary that is trained to fit the input data can significantly improve the sparsity, which has applications in data decomposition, compression, and analysis, and has been used in the fields of image denoising and classification, and video and audio processing. Sparsity and overcomplete dictionaries have immense applications in image compression, image fusion, and inpainting.

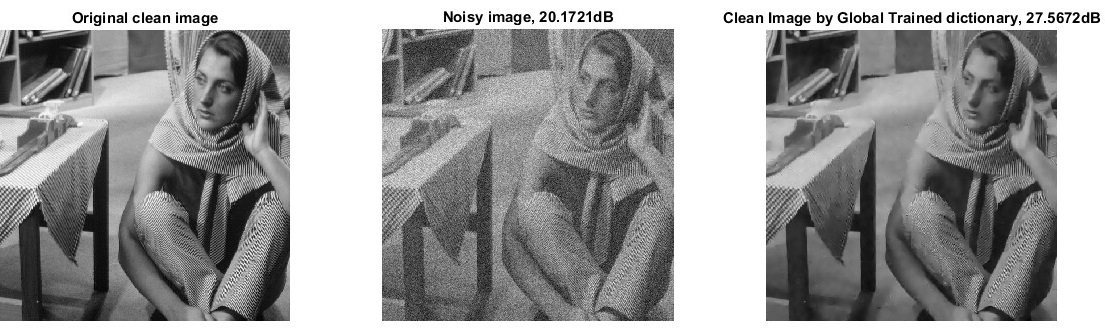
Image denoising by dictionary learning

== Problem statement ==
Given the input dataset $X = [x_1, ..., x_K], x_i \in \mathbb{R}^d$ we wish to find a dictionary $\mathbf{D} \in \mathbb{R}^{d \times n}: D = [d_1, ..., d_n]$ and a representation $R = [r_1,...,r_K], r_i \in \mathbb{R}^n$ such that both $\|X-\mathbf{D}R\|^2_F$ is minimized and the representations $r_i$ are sparse enough. This can be formulated as the following optimization problem:

$\underset{\mathbf{D} \in \mathcal{C}, r_i \in \mathbb{R}^n}{\text{argmin}} \sum_{i=1}^K\|x_i-\mathbf{D}r_i\|_2^2+\lambda \|r_i\|_0$, where $\mathcal{C} \equiv \{\mathbf{D} \in \mathbb{R}^{d \times n}: \|d_i\|_2 \leq 1 \,\, \forall i =1,...,n \}$, $\lambda>0$

$\mathcal{C}$ is required to constrain $\mathbf{D}$ so that its atoms would not reach arbitrarily high values allowing for arbitrarily low (but non-zero) values of $r_i$. $\lambda$ controls the trade off between the sparsity and the minimization error.

The minimization problem above is not convex because of the ℓ_{0}-"norm" and solving this problem is NP-hard. In some cases L^{1}-norm is known to ensure sparsity and so the above becomes a convex optimization problem with respect to each of the variables $\mathbf{D}$ and $\mathbf{R}$ when the other one is fixed, but it is not jointly convex in $(\mathbf{D}, \mathbf{R})$.

=== Properties of the dictionary ===
The dictionary $\mathbf{D}$ defined above can be "undercomplete" if $n < d$ or "overcomplete" in case $n>d$ with the latter being a typical assumption for a sparse dictionary learning problem. The case of a complete dictionary does not provide any improvement from a representational point of view and thus isn't considered.

Undercomplete dictionaries represent the setup in which the actual input data lies in a lower-dimensional space. This case is strongly related to dimensionality reduction and techniques like principal component analysis which require atoms $d_1,...,d_n$ to be orthogonal. The choice of these subspaces is crucial for efficient dimensionality reduction, but it is not trivial. And dimensionality reduction based on dictionary representation can be extended to address specific tasks such as data analysis or classification. However, their main downside is limiting the choice of atoms.

Overcomplete dictionaries, however, do not require the atoms to be orthogonal (they will never have a basis anyway) thus allowing for more flexible dictionaries and richer data representations.

An overcomplete dictionary which allows for sparse representation of signal can be a famous transform matrix (wavelets transform, fourier transform) or it can be formulated so that its elements are changed in such a way that it sparsely represents the given signal in a best way. Learned dictionaries are capable of giving sparser solutions as compared to predefined transform matrices.

== Algorithms ==
As the optimization problem described above can be solved as a convex problem with respect to either dictionary or sparse coding while the other one of the two is fixed, most of the algorithms are based on the idea of iteratively updating one and then the other.

The problem of finding an optimal sparse coding $R$ with a given dictionary $\mathbf{D}$ is known as sparse approximation (or sometimes just sparse coding problem). A number of algorithms have been developed to solve it (such as matching pursuit and LASSO) and are incorporated in the algorithms described below.

=== Method of optimal directions (MOD) ===
The method of optimal directions (or MOD) was one of the first methods introduced to tackle the sparse dictionary learning problem. The core idea of it is to solve the minimization problem subject to the limited number of non-zero components of the representation vector:

$\min_{\mathbf{D}, R}\{\|X-\mathbf{D}R\|^2_F\} \,\, \text{s.t.}\,\, \forall i \,\,\|r_i\|_0 \leq T$

Here, $F$ denotes the Frobenius norm. MOD alternates between getting the sparse coding using a method such as matching pursuit and updating the dictionary by computing the analytical solution of the problem given by $\mathbf{D} = XR^+$ where $R^+$ is a Moore-Penrose pseudoinverse. After this update $\mathbf{D}$ is renormalized to fit the constraints and the new sparse coding is obtained again. The process is repeated until convergence (or until a sufficiently small residue).

MOD has proved to be a very efficient method for low-dimensional input data $X$ requiring just a few iterations to converge. However, due to the high complexity of the matrix-inversion operation, computing the pseudoinverse in high-dimensional cases is in many cases intractable. This shortcoming has inspired the development of other dictionary learning methods.

=== K-SVD ===
K-SVD is an algorithm that performs SVD at its core to update the atoms of the dictionary one by one and basically is a generalization of K-means. It enforces that each element of the input data $x_i$ is encoded by a linear combination of not more than $T_0$ elements in a way identical to the MOD approach:

$\min_{\mathbf{D}, R}\{\|X-\mathbf{D}R\|^2_F\} \,\, \text{s.t.}\,\, \forall i \,\,\|r_i\|_0 \leq T_0$

This algorithm's essence is to first fix the dictionary, find the best possible $R$ under the above constraint (using Orthogonal Matching Pursuit) and then iteratively update the atoms of dictionary $\mathbf{D}$ in the following manner:

$\|X - \mathbf{D}R\|^2_F = \left| X - \sum_{i = 1}^K d_i x^i_T\right|^2_F = \| E_k - d_k x^k_T\|^2_F$

The next steps of the algorithm include rank-1 approximation of the residual matrix $E_k$, updating $d_k$ and enforcing the sparsity of $x_k$ after the update. This algorithm is considered to be standard for dictionary learning and is used in a variety of applications. However, it shares weaknesses with MOD being efficient only for signals with relatively low dimensionality and having the possibility for being stuck at local minima.

=== Stochastic gradient descent ===
One can also apply a widespread stochastic gradient descent method with iterative projection to solve this problem. The idea of this method is to update the dictionary using the first order stochastic gradient and project it on the constraint set $\mathcal{C}$. The step that occurs at i-th iteration is described by this expression:

$\mathbf{D}_i = \text{proj}_{\mathcal{C}} \left\{\mathbf{D}_{i-1}-\delta_i\nabla_{\mathbf{D}}\sum_{i \in S}\|x_i-\mathbf{D}r_i\|_2^2+\lambda\|r_i\|_1 \right\}$, where $S$ is a random subset of $\{1...K\}$ and $\delta_i$ is a gradient step.

=== Lagrange dual method ===
An algorithm based on solving a dual Lagrangian problem provides an efficient way to solve for the dictionary having no complications induced by the sparsity function. Consider the following Lagrangian:

$\mathcal{L}(\mathbf{D}, \Lambda) = \text{tr}\left((X-\mathbf{D}R)^T(X-\mathbf{D}R)\right) + \sum_{j=1}^n\lambda_j \left({\sum_{i=1}^d\mathbf{D}_{ij}^2-c} \right)$, where $c$ is a constraint on the norm of the atoms and $\lambda_i$ are the so-called dual variables forming the diagonal matrix $\Lambda$.

We can then provide an analytical expression for the Lagrange dual after minimization over $\mathbf{D}$:

$\mathcal{D}(\Lambda) = \min_{\mathbf{D}}\mathcal{L}(\mathbf{D}, \Lambda) = \text{tr}(X^TX-XR^T(RR^T+\Lambda)^{-1}(XR^T)^T-c\Lambda)$.

After applying one of the optimization methods to the value of the dual (such as Newton's method or conjugate gradient) we get the value of $\mathbf{D}$:

$\mathbf{D}^T=(RR^T+\Lambda)^{-1}(XR^T)^T$

Solving this problem is less computational hard because the amount of dual variables $n$ is a lot of times much less than the amount of variables in the primal problem.

=== LASSO ===
In this approach, the optimization problem is formulated as:

$\min_{r \in \mathbb{R}^n}\{\,\,\|r\|_1\} \,\, \text{subject to}\,\,\|X-\mathbf{D}R\|^2_F < \epsilon$, where $\epsilon$ is the permitted error in the reconstruction LASSO.

It finds an estimate of $r_i$ by minimizing the least square error subject to a L^{1}-norm constraint in the solution vector, formulated as:

$\min_{r \in \mathbb{R}^n} \,\, \dfrac{1}{2}\,\,\|X-\mathbf{D}r\|^2_F + \lambda \,\,\|r\|_1$, where $\lambda > 0$ controls the trade-off between sparsity and the reconstruction error. This gives the global optimal solution. See also Online dictionary learning for Sparse coding

=== Parametric training methods ===
Parametric training methods are aimed to incorporate the best of both worlds — the realm of analytically constructed dictionaries and the learned ones. This allows to construct more powerful generalized dictionaries that can potentially be applied to the cases of arbitrary-sized signals. Notable approaches include:

- Translation-invariant dictionaries. These dictionaries are composed by the translations of the atoms originating from the dictionary constructed for a finite-size signal patch. This allows the resulting dictionary to provide a representation for the arbitrary-sized signal.
- Multiscale dictionaries. This method focuses on constructing a dictionary that is composed of differently scaled dictionaries to improve sparsity.
- Sparse dictionaries. This method focuses on not only providing a sparse representation but also constructing a sparse dictionary which is enforced by the expression $\mathbf{D} = \mathbf{B}\mathbf{A}$ where $\mathbf{B}$ is some pre-defined analytical dictionary with desirable properties such as fast computation and $\mathbf{A}$ is a sparse matrix. Such formulation allows to directly combine the fast implementation of analytical dictionaries with the flexibility of sparse approaches.

=== Online dictionary learning (LASSO approach) ===
Many common approaches to sparse dictionary learning rely on the fact that the whole input data $X$ (or at least a large enough training dataset) is available for the algorithm. However, this might not be the case in the real-world scenario as the size of the input data might be too big to fit it into memory. The other case where this assumption can not be made is when the input data comes in a form of a stream. Such cases lie in the field of study of online learning which essentially suggests iteratively updating the model upon the new data points $x$ becoming available.

A dictionary can be learned in an online manner the following way:

1. For $t = 1...T:$
2. Draw a new sample $x_t$
3. Find a sparse coding using LARS: $r_t = \underset{r \in \mathbb{R}^n}{\text{argmin}}\left(\frac{1}{2}\|x_t-\mathbf{D}_{t-1}r\|+\lambda\|r\|_1\right)$
4. Update dictionary using block-coordinate approach: $\mathbf{D}_t = \underset{\mathbf{D} \in \mathcal{C}}{\text{argmin}}\frac{1}{t}\sum_{i=1}^t\left(\frac{1}{2}\|x_i-\mathbf{D}r_i\|^2_2+\lambda\|r_i\|_1\right)$

This method allows us to gradually update the dictionary as new data becomes available for sparse representation learning and helps drastically reduce the amount of memory needed to store the dataset (which often has a huge size).

== Applications ==
The dictionary learning framework, namely the linear decomposition of an input signal using a few basis elements learned from data itself, has led to state-of-art results in various image and video processing tasks. This technique can be applied to classification problems in a way that if we have built specific dictionaries for each class, the input signal can be classified by finding the dictionary corresponding to the sparsest representation. It also has properties that are useful for signal denoising since usually one can learn a dictionary to represent the meaningful part of the input signal in a sparse way but the noise in the input will have a much less sparse representation.

Sparse dictionary learning has been successfully applied to various image, video and audio processing tasks as well as to texture synthesis and unsupervised clustering. In evaluations with the Bag-of-Words model, sparse coding was found empirically to outperform other coding approaches on the object category recognition tasks.

Dictionary learning is used to analyse medical signals in detail. Such medical signals include those from electroencephalography (EEG), electrocardiography (ECG), magnetic resonance imaging (MRI), functional MRI (fMRI), continuous glucose monitors and ultrasound computer tomography (USCT), where different assumptions are used to analyze each signal.

Dictionary learning has also been applied to passive detection of unknown signals in complex environments. In particular, it enables blind signal detection in time-spreading distortion (TSD) channels, without prior knowledge of the source signal. This approach has shown effectiveness in both simulated and experimental conditions, offering robust performance in low signal-to-noise ratio scenarios.

== See also ==
- Sparse approximation
- Sparse PCA
- K-SVD
- Matrix factorization
- Neural sparse coding
