= Disjunct matrix =

Type of logical matrix

In mathematics, a logical matrix may be described as d-disjunct and/or d-separable. These concepts play a pivotal role in the mathematical area of non-adaptive group testing.

In the mathematical literature, d-disjunct matrices may also be called superimposed codes or d-cover-free families.

According to Chen and Hwang (2006),

- A matrix is said to be d-separable if no two sets of d columns have the same boolean sum.
- A matrix is said to be $\overline{d}$-separable (that's d with an overline) if no two sets of d-or-fewer columns have the same boolean sum.
- A matrix is said to be d-disjunct if no set of d columns has a boolean sum which is a superset of any other single column.

The following relationships are "well-known":

- Every $\overline{d+1}$-separable matrix is also $d$-disjunct.
- Every $d$-disjunct matrix is also $\overline{d}$-separable.
- Every $\overline{d}$-separable matrix is also $d$-separable (by definition).

== Concrete examples ==
The following $6\times 8$ matrix is 2-separable, because each pair of columns has a distinct sum. For example, the boolean sum (that is, the bitwise OR) of the first two columns is $110000\or 001100 = 111100$; that sum is not attainable as the sum of any other pair of columns in the matrix.

However, this matrix is not 3-separable, because the sum of columns 1, 2, and 3 (namely $111111$) equals the sum of columns 1, 4, and 5.

This matrix is also not $\overline{2}$-separable, because the sum of columns 1 and 8 (namely $110000$) equals the sum of column 1 alone. In fact, no matrix with an all-zero column can possibly be $\overline{d}$-separable for any $d\ge 1$.

$\quad\left[ \begin{array}{cccccccc} 1 & 0 & 0 & 1 & 1 & 0 & 0 & 0 \\ 1 & 0 & 0 & 0 & 0 & 1 & 1 & 0 \\ 0 & 1 & 0 & 1 & 0 & 1 & 0 & 0 \\ 0 & 1 & 0 & 0 & 1 & 0 & 1 & 0 \\ 0 & 0 & 1 & 0 & 1 & 1 & 0 & 0 \\ 0 & 0 & 1 & 1 & 0 & 0 & 1 & 0 \\ \end{array} \right]$

The following $6\times 4$ matrix is $\overline{3}$-separable (and thus 2-disjunct) but not 3-disjunct.

$\quad\left[ \begin{array}{cccc} 1 & 0 & 0 & 1 \\ 1 & 0 & 1 & 0 \\ 0 & 1 & 1 & 0 \\ 0 & 1 & 0 & 0 \\ 0 & 0 & 1 & 0 \\ 0 & 0 & 0 & 1 \\ \end{array} \right]$

There are 15 possible ways to choose 3-or-fewer columns from this matrix, and each choice leads to a different boolean sum:

columns	boolean sum	columns	boolean sum
none	000000	2,3	011110
1	110000	2,4	101101
2	001100	3,4	111011
3	011010	1,2,3	111110
4	100001	1,2,4	111101
1,2	111100	1,3,4	111011
1,3	111010	2,3,4	111111
1,4	110001		

However, the sum of columns 2, 3, and 4 (namely $111111$) is a superset of column 1 (namely $110000$), which means that this matrix is not 3-disjunct.

== Application of d-separability to group testing ==
The non-adaptive group testing problem postulates that we have a test which can tell us, for any set of items, whether that set contains a defective item. We are asked to come up with a series of groupings that can exactly identify all the defective items in a batch of n total items, some d of which are defective.

A $d$-separable matrix with $t$ rows and $n$ columns concisely describes how to use t tests to find the defective items in a batch of n, where the number of defective items is known to be exactly d.

A $d$-disjunct matrix (or, more generally, any $\overline{d}$-separable matrix) with $t$ rows and $n$ columns concisely describes how to use t tests to find the defective items in a batch of n, where the number of defective items is known to be no more than d.

== Practical concerns and published results ==
For a given n and d, the number of rows t in the smallest d-separable $t\times n$ matrix may (according to current knowledge) be smaller than the number of rows t in the smallest d-disjunct $t\times n$ matrix, but in asymptotically they are within a constant factor of each other. Additionally, if the matrix is to be used for practical testing, some algorithm is needed that can "decode" a test result (that is, a boolean sum such as $111100$) into the indices of the defective items (that is, the unique set of columns that produce that boolean sum). For arbitrary d-disjunct matrices, polynomial-time decoding algorithms are known; the naïve algorithm is $O(nt)$. For arbitrary d-separable but non-d-disjunct matrices, the best known decoding algorithms are exponential-time.

Porat and Rothschild (2008) present a deterministic $O(nt)$-time algorithm for constructing a d-disjunct matrix with n columns and $\Theta(d^2\ln n)$ rows.

== See also ==
- Group testing
- Concatenated code
- Compressed sensing
