= Xiaole Shirley Liu =

Professor of Biostatistics and Computational Biology at Dana-Farber and Harvard

- 刘小乐
- Education: Peking University; Smith College (BA); Stanford University (PhD)
- Awards: ISCB Fellow (2019); Breast Cancer Research Foundation Investigator; ISCB Innovator Award (2020); Benjamin Franklin Award (Bioinformatics) (2020); AIMBE Fellow (2022)
- Scientific career
- Fields: Computational biology; Cancer epigenetics; CRISPR screens; Cancer immunology
- Workplaces: Dana–Farber Cancer Institute; Harvard University; GV20 Therapeutics
- Thesis: Discovery of transcription factor binding sites using computational statistics (2002)
- Doctoral advisor: Douglas Brutlag; Jun S. Liu
- Website: liulab-dfci.github.io

Xiaole Shirley Liu (Chinese: 刘小乐) is a computational biologist, cancer researcher, and entrepreneur. She has been a Professor in the Department of Data Sciences at the Dana-Farber Cancer Institute and Harvard T.H. Chan School of Public Health. She co-founded GV20 Therapeutics and, in early 2022, left DFCI to become its full-time CEO.

== Early life ==
Xiaole Shirley Liu was born 刘小乐 in Tianjin China to Meilun Liu and Xingke Hu, both on the faculty of Tianjin University. From an early age, her elder brother sparked her interest in biology.

== Education ==
Xiaole Liu attended Peking University in 1992–1994. She transferred to Smith College and graduated summa cum laude in 1997 double majoring in biochemistry and computer science. Her research thesis, supervised under Steve Williams, was awarded the Highest Departmental Honors in Biochemistry.

She then went to Stanford University and got her Ph.D. in biomedical Informatics and computer science in 2002. Her thesis committee included Douglas Brutlag, Jun S. Liu, Russ Altman, Patrick O. Brown and Rob Tibshirani. She added Shirley as her middle name after Ph.D., and used X. Shirley Liu in her publications.

== Career ==
Shirley Liu was a professor of Biostatistics and Computational Biology at Dana-Farber Cancer Institute and Harvard T.H. Chan School of Public Health. She is also a researcher with works focused on computational development and data integration modeling for translational cancer research. Her group developed approaches and frameworks regarding transcriptional and epigenetic gene regulation (MACS, Cistrome, MDscan, BETA), CRISPR screens (MAGeCK), and tumor immunity (TIMER, TIDE, TRUST). She has also contributed to the discovery of cancer drug response biomarkers, drug resistance mechanisms, and effective combination therapies.

In 2016, Shirley co-founded GV20 Therapeutics. In 2022, she then became the CEO of GV20.

== Awards and honours ==
X. Shirley Liu was elected a Fellow of the International Society for Computational Biology (ISCB) in 2019 for her “outstanding contributions to the fields of computational biology and bioinformatics”.
