= Arthur Dempster =

Arthur Dempster may refer to:

- Arthur Jeffrey Dempster (1886–1950), physicist at the University of Chicago and Manhattan Project participant
- Arthur P. Dempster (1929–2026), American mathematical statistician and academic
