= List of countries implementing pool testing strategy against COVID-19 =

If not otherwise stated, the virological status of sample pools is evaluated through PCR tests.

== Screening strategies ==
=== General population ===
Large-scale screening strategies
Country	Institution	Date	Total sampled	Number in pools	Specimen Type	References
Switzerland		18/12/2021	>6,000,000	10	Saliva	
United States Washington	University of Washington	7/23/2020	>100,000	4	Nasopharyngeal swab	
United States California	Stanford Medical Center	06/03/2020	2,888 (3 positives)	10	Nasopharyngeal swab	
United States Nebraska	University of Nebraska	20/04/2020	1,700/week	5	Nasopharyngeal swab	
United States Kansas	Clinical Reference Laboratory, Lenexa	31/08/2020	6,000/week	5	Saliva	
Spain	Fundación Biomédica Galicia Sur, CHUVI	10/08/2020	100,000/month	20	Saliva	
Israel	Rambam Clinical Microbiology Laboratory	18/03/2020	N.A.	up to 64	Nasopharyngeal swab	
Germany	Saarland University Medical Center	29/04/2020	22,000	30	Nasopharyngeal swab	
China	Wuhan Centre for Disease Control	08/06/2020	>1M	5-10	Nasal/Oral swabs	
China	Qingdao	08/06/2020	7M	To confirm	To confirm	
China	Kashgar City	26/11/2020	4.5M	To confirm	To confirm	
China	Qingdao City	15/10/2020	11M	10	To confirm	
Portugal	Algarve Biomedical Centre	24/04/2020	17,000	10	Nasopharyngeal swab	
Australia	Victorian Infectious Diseases Reference Laboratory, Melbourne	25/08/2020	10,312	2-8	Nasopharyngeal swab	
Singapore	Ministry of Health	02/2020	9,000	10	N.A.	
Ghana	Noguchi Memorial Institute for Medical Research	04/2020	30,000	10	Mixed origin	
Philippines	Makati Health Department	15/08/2020	10,000	Unknown	Unknown	
Vietnam	Danang Center for Disease Control	05/08/2020	>10,000	Unknown	Unknown	
Ecuador	Universidad de Las Americas	05/08/2020	1,500	3	Nasopharyngeal swabs	
South Korea	Jeonbuk National University Medical School and Hospital, Jeonju	14/07/20				
India Uttar Pradesh	King George's Medical University, Lucknow					
India West Bengal						
India Punjab						
India Chhattisgarh						
India Maharashtra						
Malaysia	International Medical University, Kuala Lumpur	27/04/2020	2,732 (52 positives)	10	Nasopharyngeal swab	
Uruguay	Pan American Health Organisation (PAHO).	22/09/2020		10		
Morocco	Casablanca	09/06/2020		5-10		
Brazil	Florianópolis	05/05/2020	19,535 (246 positives)	16	Nasopharyngeal swab	

=== Campus screening strategies ===
Screening strategies in University Campus
Country	Campus	Date	Total sampled	Number in pools	Specimen Type	References
Switzerland	Université de Genève	2021			saliva	
UK	University of Nottingham	25/09/2020			self-collected saliva	
UK	Cambridge University	25/09/2020	expected: 16 000/week		self-collected nasopharyngeal	
Belgium	Université de Liège	26/06/2020	expected: 30,000/week	8	self-collected saliva	
United States	College of Mount Saint Vincent	09/2020		5 to 24	self-collected saliva	
United States	Duke University	08/2020		5 to 10	self-collected nasal	
United States	Michigan State University	08/2020	14,000/week	8 or 10	self-collected saliva	
United States	Syracuse University	07/2020	20,000/week	25	self-collected saliva	
United States	University of South Florida	08/2020	?	5 to 10	?	
United States	Colorado School	03/11/2020	(expected: 3,000/week)	8	self-collected saliva	
United States	Shenandoah University	15/10/2020	2,000		self-collected saliva	

SUNY campuses are implementing a pool testing strategy based on saliva samples, including Cornell, SUNY Fredonia or SUNY Oneonta.

The University of Tennessee is also implementing a saliva pool testing strategy.

Researchers from Yale University, Georgia Augusta University, the University of Illinois, are also considering or implementing pool testing strategies.

== Small-scale screening or experimental protocols ==
Smaller scale screening or experimental protocols
Country	Institution	Date	Total sampled	Number in pools	Specimen Type	References
France	Hôpital Bichat	03/06/2020	448	16	nasopharyngeal swab	
Spain	Hospital Clínico Universitario, Institute for Research, Valencia	04/05/2020	N.A.	5-10	nasopharyngeal swab	
Spain	Universidade de Santiago, Santiago	02/06/2020	N.A.	5-20	nasopharyngeal swab	
Chile	Universidad Austral de Chile	06/2020	610	20	nasopharyngeal swab	
Kenya	Pwani University & Oxford	13/08/2020 0	1500	6	nasopharyngeal swab	
Thailand	Chulalongkorn University, Bangkok	13/08/2020	N.A.	10	nasopharyngeal swab	
Rwanda	University of Rwanda, Kigali	30/04/2020	N.A.	20-100	oropharyngeal swab	
Italy	Sant'Andrea Hospital and Sapienza University, Rome	03/08/2020	>2035	5	naso-oropharyngeal swab	
Thailand	Mahidol University, Bangkok	25/08/2020	N.A.	5-10	saliva	

== See also ==
- Group testing
- COVID-19 testing
