= Future of mathematics =

The progression of both the nature of mathematics and individual mathematical problems into the future is a widely debated topic; many past predictions about modern mathematics have been misplaced or completely false, so there is reason to believe that many predictions today will follow a similar path. However, the subject still carries an important weight and has been written about by many notable mathematicians. Typically, they are motivated by a desire to set a research agenda to direct efforts to specific problems, or a wish to clarify, update and extrapolate the way that subdisciplines relate to the general discipline of mathematics and its possibilities. Examples of agendas pushing for progress in specific areas in the future, historical and recent, include Felix Klein's Erlangen program, Hilbert's problems, Langlands program, and the Millennium Prize Problems. In the Mathematics Subject Classification section 01Axx History of mathematics and mathematicians, subsection 01A67 is titled Future prospectives.

The accuracy of predictions about mathematics has varied widely and has proceeded very closely to that of technology. As such, it is important to keep in mind that many of the predictions by researchers below may be misguided or turn out to be untrue.

== Motivations and methodology for speculation ==
According to Henri Poincaré writing in 1908 (English translation), "The true method of forecasting the future of mathematics lies in the study of its history and its present state". The historical approach can consist of the study of earlier predictions, and comparing them to the present state of the art to see how the predictions have fared, e.g. monitoring the progress of Hilbert's problems. A subject survey of mathematics itself however is now problematic: the sheer expansion of the subject gives rise to issues of mathematical knowledge management.

The development of technology has also significantly impacted the outcomes of many predictions; because of the uncertain nature of the future of technology, this leads to quite a bit of uncertainty in the future of mathematics. Also entailed by this is that successful predictions about future technology may also result in successful mathematical predictions.

Given the support of research by governments and other funding bodies, concerns about the future form part of the rationale of the distribution of funding. Mathematical education must also consider changes that are happening in the mathematical requirements of the workplace; course design will be influenced both by current and by possible future areas of application of mathematics. László Lovász, in Trends in Mathematics: How they could Change Education? describes how the mathematics community and mathematical research activity is growing and states that this will mean changes in the way things are done: larger organisations mean more resources are spent on overheads (coordination and communication); in mathematics this would equate to more time engaged in survey and expository writing.

== Mathematics in general ==
=== Subject divisions ===
Steven G. Krantz writes in "The Proof is in the Pudding. A Look at the Changing Nature of Mathematical Proof": "It is becoming increasingly evident that the delineations among “engineer” and “mathematician” and “physicist” are becoming ever more vague. It seems plausible that in 100 years we will no longer speak of mathematicians as such but rather of mathematical scientists. It would not be at all surprising if the notion of “the Department of Mathematics” at the college and university level gives way to “the Division of Mathematical Sciences”."

=== Experimental mathematics ===
Experimental mathematics is the use of computers to generate large data sets within which to automate the discovery of patterns which can then form the basis of conjectures and eventually new theories. The paper "Experimental Mathematics: Recent Developments and Future Outlook" describes expected increases in computer capabilities: better hardware in terms of speed and memory capacity; better software in terms of increasing sophistication of algorithms; more advanced visualization facilities; the mixing of numerical and symbolic methods.

=== Semi-rigorous mathematics ===
Doron Zeilberger considers a time when computers become so powerful that the predominant questions in mathematics change from proving things to determining how much it would cost: "As wider classes of identities, and perhaps even other kinds of classes of theorems, become routinely provable, we might witness many results for which we would know how to find a proof (or refutation), but we would be unable, or unwilling, to pay for finding such proofs, since “almost certainty” can be bought so much cheaper. I can envision an abstract of a paper, c. 2100, that reads : “We show, in a certain precise sense, that the Goldbach conjecture is true with probability larger than 0.99999, and that its complete truth could be determined with a budget of $10B.”" Some people strongly disagree with Zeilberger's prediction; for example, it has been described as provocative and quite wrongheaded, whereas it has also been stated that choosing which theorems are interesting enough to pay for already happens as a result of funding bodies making decisions as to which areas of research to invest in.

=== Automated mathematics ===
In "Rough structure and classification", Timothy Gowers writes about three stages: 1) at the moment computers are just slaves doing boring calculations, 2) soon databases of mathematical concepts and proof methods will lead to an intermediate stage where computers are very helpful with theorem proving but unthreatening, and 3) within a century computers will be better than humans at theorem proving.

Terence Tao and Alessio Figalli (both recipients of Fields Medal) don't agree with Gowers statements, especially those concerning "a threat".

== Mathematics by subject ==
Different subjects of mathematics have very different predictions; for example, while every subject of mathematics is seen to be altered by the computer, some branches are seen to benefit from the use of technology to aid human achievement, while in others computers are predicted to completely replace humans.

=== Pure mathematics ===
==== Combinatorics ====
In 2001, Peter Cameron in "Combinatorics entering the third millennium" organizes predictions for the future of combinatorics:

throw some light on present trends and future directions. I have divided the causes into four groups: the influence of the computer; the growing sophistication of combinatorics; its strengthening links with the rest of mathematics; and wider changes in society. What is clear, though, is that combinatorics will continue to elude attempts at formal specification.

Béla Bollobás writes: "Hilbert, I think, said that a subject is alive only if it has an abundance of problems. It is exactly this that makes combinatorics very much alive. I have no doubt that combinatorics will be around in a hundred years from now. It will be a completely different subject but it will still flourish simply because it still has many, many problems".

==== Mathematical logic ====
In the year 2000, mathematical logic was discussed in "The Prospects For Mathematical Logic In The Twenty-First Century", including set theory, mathematical logic in computer science, and proof theory.

=== Applied mathematics ===
==== Numerical analysis and scientific computing ====
In 2000, Lloyd N. Trefethen wrote "Predictions for scientific computing 50 years from now", which concluded with the theme that "Human beings will be removed from the loop" and writing in 2008 in The Princeton Companion to Mathematics predicted that by 2050 most numerical programs will be 99% intelligent wrapper and only 1% algorithm, and that the distinction between linear and non-linear problems, and between forward problems (one step) and inverse problems (iteration), and between algebraic and analytic problems, will fade as everything becomes solved by iterative methods inside adaptive intelligent systems that mix and match and combine algorithms as required.

==== Data analysis ====
In 1998, Mikhail Gromov in "Possible Trends in Mathematics in the Coming Decades", says that traditional probability theory applies where global structure such as the Gauss Law emerges when there is a lack of structure between individual data points, but that one of today's problems is to develop methods for analyzing structured data where classical probability does not apply. Such methods might include advances in wavelet analysis, higher-dimensional methods and inverse scattering.

==== Control theory ====
A list of grand challenges for control theory is outlined in "Future Directions in Control, Dynamics, and Systems: Overview, Grand Challenges, and New Courses".

==== Mathematical biology ====
Mathematical biology is one of the fastest expanding areas of mathematics at the beginning of the 21st century. "Mathematics Is Biology's Next Microscope, Only Better; Biology Is Mathematics' Next Physics, Only Better" is an essay by Joel E. Cohen.

==== Mathematical physics ====
Mathematical physics is an enormous and diverse subject. Some indications of future research directions are given in "New Trends in Mathematical Physics: Selected Contributions of the XVth International Congress on Mathematical Physics".

== See also ==
- List of unsolved problems in mathematics
