= Robert Dorfman =

American economist (1916–2002)

- Born: October 27, 1916; New York City
- Died: June 24, 2002 (aged 85); Belmont, Massachusetts

Academic background
- Education: Columbia University; University of California, Berkeley
- Doctoral advisor: William Fellner; R. Aaron Gordon

Academic work
- Discipline: Economics
- Institutions: Harvard University
- Doctoral students: Victor Niederhoffer

Robert Dorfman (27 October 1916 – 24 June 2002) was professor of political economy at Harvard University. Dorfman made great contributions to the fields of economics, statistics, group testing and in the process of coding theory.

His paper—'The Detection of Defective Members of Large Populations' (1943) is a landmark in the sphere of Combinatorial Group Testing. To quote collaborator and Nobel laureate Robert M. Solow—"After starting his career as a statistician—his paper 'The Detection of Defective Members of Large Populations' (1943) is still a landmark—he turned to economics at the moment when linear models of production and allocation captured the profession's imagination." Dorfman co-authored Linear Programming and Economic Analysis with Solow and economist Paul A. Samuelson.

== Biography ==
Dorfman was born in New York City on 27 October 1916. He received his B.A. in Mathematical Statistics from Columbia College, NY in 1936 and his M.A. from Columbia University in 1937. In 1939 he published an important paper on the so-called delta method, widely used in statistics to establish parameters of non-linear functions of random variables. He worked for the federal government as a statistician for 4 years, starting in 1939 and also served as an operations analyst for the United States Army Air Forces during the Second World War. In 1946, he enrolled at the University of California, Berkeley and got his Ph.D. in Economics in 1950 with thesis titled Applications of Linear Programming to the Theory of the Firm.

Dorfman finally moved to Harvard in 1955. Dorfman's career at Harvard spanned 32 years. Professor of Economics from 1955 to 1972, Dorfman became the David A. Wells Professor of Political Economy in 1972, a position he held until his retirement in 1987.

According to his wife Nancy, Dorfman turned to mathematics as an alternative to poetry after realizing that he did not have a future as a poet. According to the Harvard Gazette, "His lifelong love of poetry and literature was reflected in the clarity and grace with which he was able to explain complex economics in simple language, widely remarked upon by his colleagues."

Dorfman received many honors, including a Guggenheim Fellowship and two Ford Faculty Research Fellowships; he was named a Distinguished Fellow of the American Economic Association and a Fellow of the American Academy of Arts and Sciences. From 1976 to 1984, he served as editor of the Quarterly Journal of Economics. During his long and wide-ranging career, Dorfman was vice president of the American Economic Association, vice president of the Association of Environmental and Resource Economists, and member of several committees focused on environmental concerns. He chaired the National Research Council's Committee on Prototype Analysis of Pesticides in 1978. He was elected to the 2002 class of Fellows of the Institute for Operations Research and the Management Sciences.

To quote Solow,

"Always polite, even self-deprecating, never assertive, he nevertheless stood his ground. If Bob Dorfman mildly and quizzically expressed some hesitation about your pet idea, it was always a good move to look up, just in case a boulder was about to crash down on you—politely, of course."

== Work and professional opinions ==
Apart from his work in group testing, he made great contributions to environmental economics, especially regarding natural resources in the Middle East and South Asia. His analysis of the water resources in Pakistan helped draw engineers and hydrologists and got significant work done towards the preservation and economic use of scarce natural resources. In the later years of his professional life, he turned his focus towards economic history. His work in the area of capital theory and its antecedent led to the modernization of economist Eugen Böhm von Bawerk's 19th century "Austrian" theory of capital.

Some of his major works include:

- "Design of Water Resource Systems" (1962), co-authored with Arthur Maass, Maynard Hufschmidt, and others;
- "Prices and Markets" (1967); "Models for Managing Water Quality" (1972), co-authored with Henry D. Jacoby and H.A. Thomas Jr.;
- "Economics of the Environment" (1972), co-authored with Nancy S. Dorfman; and "Economic Theory and Public Decisions" (1997)

In the preface to his collected works, "Economic Theory and Public Decisions"(1997), Dorfman expressed his personal reservations about "reducing the amount of instruction in the social science side of economics to make way for mathematics." He however, remained ambivalent about the costs and the benefits of this change in methodology while recognizing its inevitability. To quote James Duesenberry, professor emeritus of Economics and a longtime colleague of Dorfman's, "He was really devoted to scholarship; he was a very careful worker in everything he did, he was always a public-spirited member of this department."

== Publications ==
- Dorfman, Robert, with Paul Samuelson and Robert Solow. (1958), Linear Programming and Economic Analysis McGraw-Hill Chapter-preview links.
- Dorfman, Robert; Maass Arthur; Hufschmidt, Maynard; Harold, Thomas A. Jr; Marglin Stephen A; Fair, Gordon Maskew. (1962). Design of Water Resource Systems Harvard University Press.
- Dorfman, Robert; Thomas H. A. Jr.; Jacoby, H. D. (1967). Prices and Market Prentice Hall.
- Dorfman, Robert; Thomas H. A. Jr.; Jacoby, H. D. (1972). Models for managing Water Quality Harvard University Press
- Dorfman, Robert; Dorfman, Nancy S. (1997). Economic Theory and Public Decisions Edward Elgar
- Dorfman, R. The Detection of Defective Members of Large Populations. The Annals of Mathematical Statistics, 14(4), 436–440. Retrieved from
