= Emmanuel Candès =

French statistician (born 1970)

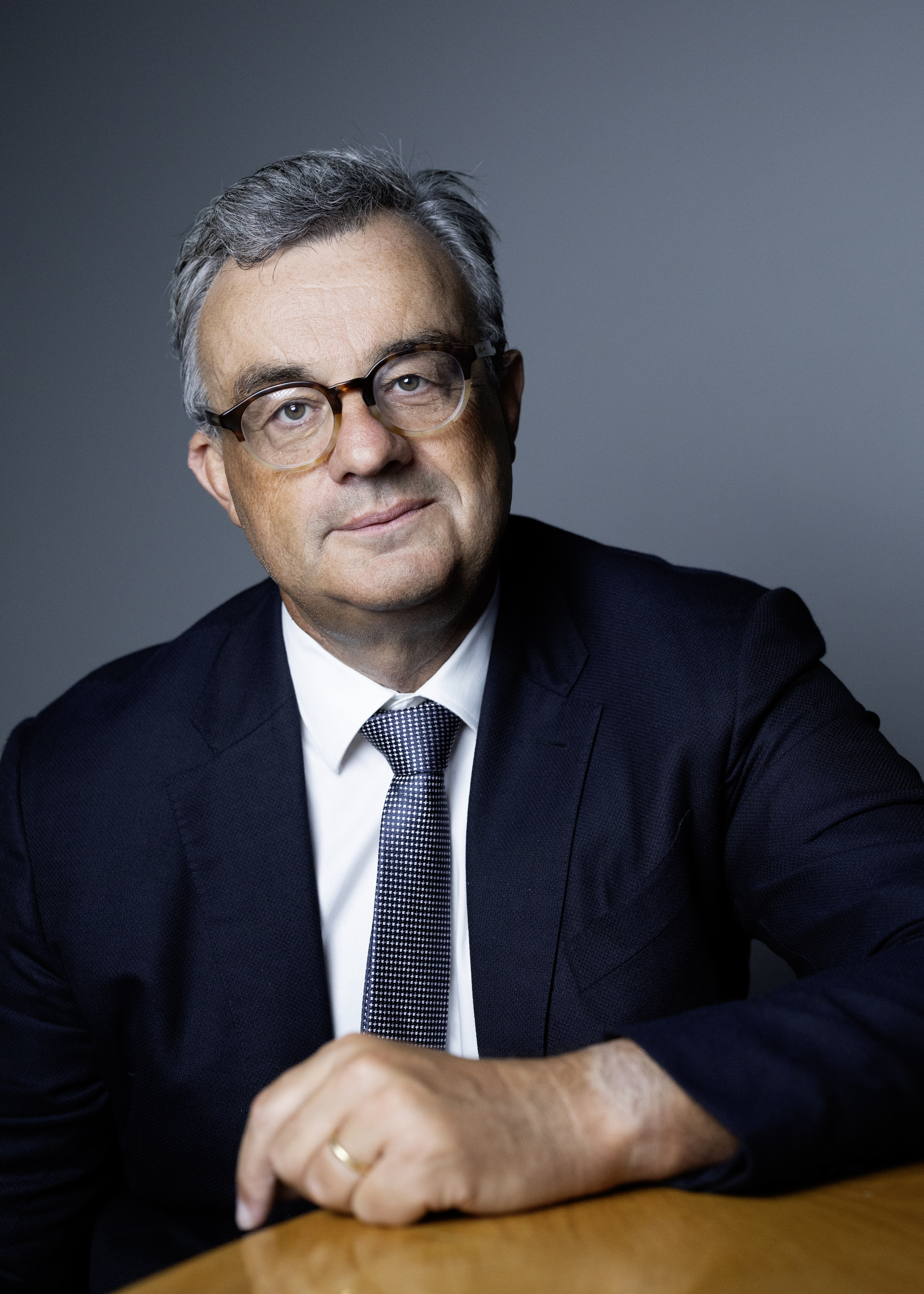
- Born: 27 April 1970 (age 56); Paris, France
- Education: Stanford University; École Polytechnique
- Known for: Wavelet theory, Curvelets, Compressed sensing
- Spouse: Chiara Sabatti
- Awards: Alfred P. Sloan Research Fellowship (2001); James H. Wilkinson Prize in Numerical Analysis and Scientific Computing (2005); Vasil A. Popov Prize (2006); Alan T. Waterman Award (2006); Information Theory Society Paper Award (2008); George Pólya Prize (2010); Collatz Prize (ICIAM) (2011); Lagrange Prize in Continuous Optimization (2012); Dannie Heineman Prize (2013); MacArthur Genius Grant (2017); Shaw Prize in Mathematical Sciences (2026)
- Scientific career
- Fields: Statistics; Electrical engineering
- Workplaces: Stanford University; California Institute of Technology
- Doctoral advisor: David Donoho
- Doctoral students: Vlad Voroninski

Emmanuel Jean Candès (born 27 April 1970) is a French statistician most well known for his contributions to the field of compressed sensing and statistical hypothesis testing. He is a professor of statistics and electrical engineering (by courtesy) at Stanford University, where he is also the Barnum-Simons Chair in Mathematics and Statistics. Candès is a 2017 MacArthur Fellow.

== Academic biography ==
Candès earned an MSc from the École Polytechnique in 1993. He did his postgraduate studies at Stanford, where he earned a PhD in statistics in 1998 under the supervision of David Donoho and immediately joined the Stanford faculty as an assistant professor of statistics. He moved to the California Institute of Technology in 2000, where in 2006 he was named the Ronald and Maxine Linde Professor of Applied and Computational Mathematics. He returned to Stanford in 2009.

== Research ==
Candès' early research concerned nonlinear approximation theory. In his PhD thesis, he developed generalizations of wavelets called curvelets and ridgelets that were able to capture higher order structures in signals. This work has had significant impact in image processing and multiscale analysis, and earned him the Popov prize in approximation theory in 2001.

In 2006, Candès wrote a paper with Australian-American mathematician Terence Tao that spearheaded the field of compressed sensing: the recovery of sparse signals from a few carefully constructed and seemingly random measurements. Many researchers have since contributed to this field, which has introduced the idea of a camera that can record pictures while needing only one sensor element, instead of an array.

== Awards and honors ==
In 2001 Candès received an Alfred P. Sloan Research Fellowship. He was awarded the James H. Wilkinson Prize in Numerical Analysis and Scientific Computing in 2005. In 2006, he received the Vasil A. Popov Prize as well as the National Science Foundation's highest honor: the Alan T. Waterman Award for research described by the NSF as "nothing short of revolutionary". In 2010 Candès and Terence Tao were awarded the George Pólya Prize. In 2011, Candès was awarded the ICIAM Collatz Prize. Candès has also received the Lagrange Prize in Continuous Optimization, awarded by the Mathematical Optimization Society (MOS) and the Society for Industrial and Applied Mathematics (SIAM). He was also presented with the Dannie Heineman Prize by the Academy of Sciences at Göttingen in 2013. In 2014 he was elected to the National Academy of Sciences. In 2015 he received the George David Birkhoff Prize of the AMS / SIAM. He is also a fellow of SIAM. In 2017 Candès received the MacArthur Fellowship for exploring the limits of signal recovery and matrix completion from incomplete data sets with implications for high-impact applications in multiple fields.

He was elected to the 2018 class of fellows of the American Mathematical Society. In 2020, Candès was awarded the Princess of Asturias Award for Technical and Scientific Research. In 2026, he was awarded the Shaw Prize in Mathematical Sciences.

== Personal life ==
Candès is married to Stanford statistician Chiara Sabatti.
