= Jun S. Liu =

American mathematician and statistician

Jun Liu
- Born: April 26, 1965 (age 60)
- Education: Peking University (BS); Rutgers University; University of Chicago (PhD)
- Awards: NSF CAREER Award (1995); COPSS' Award (2002); Morningside Gold Medal (2010); Pao-Lu Hsu Award (2016); Jerome Sacks Award (2017); Mitchell Prize (2000); IMS Medallion Lecture (2002); Bernoulli Lecture (2004); IMS Fellow (2004); ASA Fellow (2005); ISCB Fellow (2022)
- Scientific career
- Fields: Statistical Machine Learning; Monte Carlo Methods; Bayesian statistics Computational biology High-dimensional statistics
- Institutions: Harvard University; Stanford University; Tsinghua University
- Thesis: Correlation Structure and Convergence Rate of the Gibbs Sampler (1986)
- Doctoral advisor: Wing Hung Wong; Augustine Kong
- Doctoral students: Yuguo Chen; Xiaole Shirley Liu; Chiara Sabatti
- Website: www.people.fas.harvard.edu/~junliu

Jun S. Liu (Chinese: 刘军; pinyin: Liú Jūn; born 1965) is a Chinese-American statistician focusing on Bayesian statistical inference, statistical machine learning, and computational biology. He was assistant professor of statistics at Harvard University from 1991 to 1994. From 1994 to 2004, he was Assistant, Associate, and full Professor of Statistics (promoted while being on leave) at Stanford University. In 2000, Liu returned to Harvard as Professor of Statistics in the Department of Statistics and also held a courtesy appointment at Harvard T.H. Chan School of Public Health. In September 2025, Liu left the United States and moved to Tsinghua University for a full-time appointment.

Liu has written many research papers and a book about Markov chain Monte Carlo algorithms, including their applications in biology. He is also co-author of several early software on biological sequence motif discovery.: MACAW, Gibbs Motif Sampler, BioProspector, Motif regressor, MDScan, Tmod; on genetic data analysis: BLADE, HAPLOTYPER, PL-EM, BEAM; and more recently on, genome structure, gene expression and cell type analysis: HiCNorm, BACH, CLIME, RABIT, CLIC, TIMER, and PhyloAcc.

== Education ==
Liu received his B.S. from Peking University in 1985. He was a Ph.D. candidate of mathematics at Rutgers University from 1986 to 1988, and obtained his Ph.D. in statistics under the supervision of Wing Hung Wong and Augustine Kong from the University of Chicago in 1991.

== Career and research ==
Liu was the recipient of the 2002 COPSS Presidents' Award, which is arguably the most prestigious award in the field of statistics. He also won the 2010 Morningside Gold Medal in Applied Mathematics; and awarded the 2016 Pao-Lu Hsu award by the International Chinese Statistical Association (given every three years to an individual under age 50).

Liu was an Institute of Mathematical Statistics (IMS) Medallion Lecturer in 2002 and a Bernoulli Lecturer in 2004. He was elected a fellow of the Institute of Mathematical Statistics in 2004, fellow of the American Statistical Association in 2005, and fellow of the International Society for Computational Biology in 2022.
