= Chiara Sabatti =

Italian and American statistician

- Born: Brescia, Italy
- Education: Bocconi University; Stanford University
- Spouse: Emmanuel Candès
- Scientific career
- Institutions: UCLA; Stanford University
- Thesis: Group Transformations and Dimensionality Reduction in Transition Rules for MCMC (1998)
- Doctoral advisor: Jun S. Liu
- Other academic advisors: Eugenio Regazzini; Neil Risch
- Website: chiarasabatti.su.domains

Chiara Sabatti is an Italian and American statistician and statistical geneticist, and a professor of biomedical data science and of statistics at Stanford University. Her research involves the analysis of high-throughput genomics data.

== Education and career ==
Sabatti was born in Brescia, Italy. She studied in Brescia and Milan and earned her bachelor's and master's degrees in statistics and economics from Bocconi University in 1993, summa cum laude, working there with Eugenio Regazzini. She came to Stanford University for doctoral study in statistics, and completed her Ph.D. in 1998. Her dissertation, Group Transformations and Dimensionality Reduction in Transition Rules for MCMC, was supervised by Jun S. Liu.

After postdoctoral research at Stanford in the group of Neil Risch, Sabatti became an assistant professor of human genetics and statistics at the University of California, Los Angeles in 2000. She returned to Stanford as an associate professor of health research and policy in 2009, changing to biomedical data science and statistics in 2015. She was promoted to full professor at Stanford in 2016.

== Recognition ==
Sabatti was named to the 2022 class of Fellows of the Institute of Mathematical Statistics, for "excellent research in statistical genetics; and leadership in defining a role for statistics in data science and developing educational pathways supporting data intensive science. For outreach efforts and commitment to increase research involvement of underrepresented minorities".

== Personal life ==
Sabatti is married to Stanford statistician and data scientist Emmanuel Candès.
