= Augustine Kong =

Statistical geneticist

- Born: Chung Tung Augustine Kong
- Education: Harvard University
- Scientific career
- Fields: Statistical genetics
- Institutions: University of Chicago deCODE genetics University of Oxford
- Thesis: Multivariate belief functions and graphical models (1986)
- Doctoral advisor: Arthur Pentland Dempster
- Doctoral students: Jun S. Liu

Chung Tung Augustine Kong is a statistical geneticist who is Professor of Statistical Genetics at the University of Oxford's Nuffield Department of Medicine, where he is also the Senior Group Leader in Genomic Epidemiology. He was previously the head of the statistics team at the Icelandic company deCODE genetics, and before that, he taught at the University of Chicago. He has conducted research on the genetic basis of educational attainment and the way in which it can be influenced by "genetic nurture", or the genes carried by parents but not passed on to their children.
