= Miriam Gasko Donoho =

American statistician

Miriam (Miki) Gasko Donoho (also published as Miriam Gasko-Green) is an American statistician whose research topics have included data visualization,^{[A]} equivalences between binary regression and survival analysis,^{[B]} and robust regression.^{[C]}

== Education and career ==
Gasko completed her Ph.D. in statistics at Harvard University in 1981. Her dissertation was Testing Sequentially Selected Outliers from Linear Models. She became a professor of marketing and quantitative studies in the College of Business at San Jose State University, director of the Silicon Valley Consumer Confidence Survey, and treasurer of the Institute of Mathematical Statistics.

== Recognition ==
She is a Fellow of the Institute of Mathematical Statistics. MacSpin, a program for three-dimensional data visualization that she developed with her husband David Donoho and brother-in-law Andrew Donoho, was named as the best scientific/engineering software of 1987 by MacUser magazine.

== Selected publications ==
A.	Donoho, A. W.; Donoho, D. L.; Gasko, M. (July 1988), "MacSpin: dynamic graphics on a desktop computer", IEEE Computer Graphics and Applications, 8 (4): 51–58, Bibcode:1988ICGA....8d..51D, doi:10.1109/38.7749, S2CID 6842862

B.	Doksum, Kjell A.; Gasko, Miriam (December 1990), "On a correspondence between models in binary regression analysis and in survival analysis", International Statistical Review, 58 (3): 243–252, doi:10.2307/1403807, JSTOR 1403807

C.	Donoho, David L.; Gasko, Miriam (1992), "Breakdown properties of location estimates based on halfspace depth and projected outlyingness", The Annals of Statistics, 20 (4): 1803–1827, Bibcode:1992AnSta..2048890D, doi:10.1214/aos/1176348890, MR 1193313
