= Douglas Lee Brutlag =

American molecular biologist (born 1946)

Douglas Lee Brutlag (born December 19, 1946) is an American molecular biologist and Professor Emeritus of Biochemistry and Medicine at Stanford University. He is recognized as a pioneer in the fields of bioinformatics and computational molecular biology.

== Education and early research ==
Brutlag earned a B.S. with honors in Biology from the California Institute of Technology (Caltech) in 1968, where he published three papers in Dr. James Bonner's laboratory. He was accepted to graduate programs at Harvard, Berkeley, and Stanford, ultimately choosing Stanford University for his Ph.D. in Biochemistry, which he received with "Great Distinction" in 1972.

While at Stanford, Brutlag joined the lab of Nobel Laureate Arthur Kornberg. His doctoral research included the discovery of two major functions of DNA Polymerase I: the 3' exonuclease proofreading function that corrects mispaired bases during DNA replication, and the 5' exonuclease function involved in RNA primer removal during Okazaki fragment processing.

== Career ==
From 1972 to 1974, Brutlag completed a postdoctoral fellowship at the Commonwealth Scientific and Industrial Research Organization (CSIRO) in Canberra, Australia under the mentorship of Dr. Jim Peacock, a prominent molecular biologist and head of the Australian Scientific Society. There, he developed cloning methods for eukaryotic DNA in bacteria and characterized a significant portion of heterochromatic DNA sequences in Drosophila, ultimately sequencing around 20% of its genome.

He returned to Stanford in 1974 as a faculty member, continuing research on Drosophila heterochromatin. Simultaneously, he began collaborations with artificial intelligence pioneer Edward Feigenbaum. This collaboration led to the development of computational methods for predicting gene and protein functions.

== Contributions ==
Brutlag's lab developed several early databases and algorithms for protein function prediction, including:

- Emotifs: Short amino acid sequence motifs that identify functional sites in proteins.
- Eblocks: A database of hidden Markov models for identifying functional protein sites in distantly related organisms.

Although an early attempt to create 3D active site models through the Efold project was less successful, it laid groundwork that inspired later breakthroughs in protein folding prediction.

Brutlag co-founded IntelliCorp in 1980 and IntelliGenetics in 1981, the latter of which became a major provider of bioinformatics software and was responsible for managing GenBank, the primary public DNA sequence database. IntelliGenetics also worked with global patent offices to manage and synchronize databases of patented DNA and protein sequences.

In 1993, Brutlag was a founding member of the International Society for Computational Biology (ISCB) and helped organize the first Intelligent Systems for Molecular Biology (ISMB) symposium held at Stanford.

== Academic service and teaching ==
He served on numerous committees at Stanford University and Stanford Medical School. He also contributed to early digitization initiatives with the Stanford Libraries and collaborated with Google and others to digitize public-domain materials.

== Honors and appointments ==
Brutlag has received numerous academic honors and held several prestigious advisory roles throughout his career, including the following:

- Honorary Professor of Bioinformatics, Keio University (2001–2003)
- Fellow, American Association for the Advancement of Science (1986)
- Fellow, American College of Medical Informatics (2001)
- Member, National Library of Medicine 20-year planning panel (helped establish NCBI)
- Member, Presidential Scientific Advisory Board, Max Planck Society (2003–2015)

== Industry and editorial roles ==
- Board of Directors, IntelliCorp (1980–1985)
- Board of Directors, IntelliGenetics (1986–1991)
- Editorial Board, Journal of Computational Biology (1993–1998)
- Chairman, Scientific Advisory Board, Pathwork Informatics (2003–2006)
- Chief Scientific Officer, DoubleTwist Inc. (2000–2002)

== Personal life ==
Douglas Brutlag resides in Menlo Park, California, with his wife, Simone Claude Brutlag. Douglas Brutlag married Simone Brutlag. They had a daughter, Pauline Becker who married Brian Becker, and a son Benjamin Brutlag who married Samantha Brutlag also known as Samantha Hill.
