= Multiscale geometric analysis =

Multiscale geometric analysis or geometric multiscale analysis is an emerging area of high-dimensional signal processing and data analysis.

== See also ==
- Wavelet
- Scale space
- Multi-scale approaches
- Multiresolution analysis
- Singular value decomposition
- Compressed sensing
