= Arthur P. Dempster =

American mathematician (1929–2026)

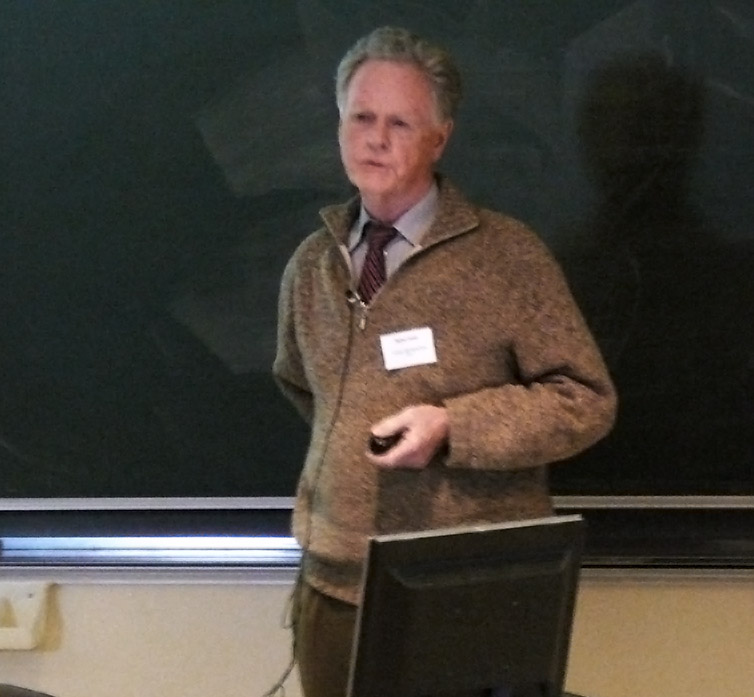
- Dempster in 2010
- Born: October 8, 1929; Toronto, Ontario, Canada
- Died: January 30, 2026 (aged 96)
- Education: Princeton University (PhD 1956); University of Toronto (BA 1952; MA 1953)
- Known for: Dempster–Shafer theory, EM algorithm
- Awards: Putnam Fellow (1951); ASA Fellow (1964); IMS Fellow (1963); Guggenheim Fellow; AAAS Fellow (1997)
- Scientific career
- Fields: Statistics
- Workplaces: Harvard University
- Thesis: The two-sample multivariate problem in the degenerate case (1956)
- Doctoral advisor: John Tukey
- Doctoral students: Augustine Kong; Nan Laird; Louise M. Ryan

Arthur Pentland Dempster (October 8, 1929 – January 30, 2026) was an American mathematician who was professor emeritus in the Harvard University department of statistics. He was one of four faculty members composing the department when it was founded in 1957.

== Life and career ==
Dempster received his B.A. in mathematics and physics (1952) and M.A. in mathematics (1953), both from the University of Toronto. He obtained his Ph.D. in mathematical statistics from Princeton University in 1956. His thesis, titled The two-sample multivariate problem in the degenerate case, was written under the supervision of John Tukey.

Dempster died on January 30, 2026, at the age of 96.

== Academic works ==
Among his contributions to statistics are the initial theory that was expanded into the Dempster–Shafer theory with Glenn Shafer, and the expectation-maximization (EM) algorithm.

== Selected publications ==
- Dempster, A. P. (1967), "Upper and lower probabilities induced by a multivalued mapping", The Annals of Mathematical Statistics, 38 (2): 325–339, doi:10.1214/aoms/1177698950
- Dempster, A. P.; Laird, N.; Rubin, D. B. (1977), "Maximum likelihood from incomplete data via the EM algorithm", Journal of the Royal Statistical Society, Series B, 39 (1): 1–38, doi:10.1111/j.2517-6161.1977.tb01600.x, JSTOR 2984875

== Honors and awards ==
Dempster was a Putnam Fellow in 1951. He was elected as an American Statistical Association Fellow in 1964, an Institute of Mathematical Statistics Fellow in 1963, and an American Academy of Arts and Sciences Fellow in 1997. In 2009 he received a honorary doctorate from Prague University of Economics and Business.
