= Variable splitting =

Mathematical function used in optimisation

In applied mathematics and computer science, variable splitting is a decomposition method that relaxes a set of constraints.

== Details ==
When the variable $x$ appears in two sets of constraints, it is possible to substitute the new variables $x_1$ in the first constraints and $x_2$ in the second, and then join the two variables with a new "linking" constraint, which requires that

$$x_1 = x_2$$

This new linking constraint can be relaxed with a Lagrange multiplier; in many applications, a Lagrange multiplier can be interpreted as the price of equality between $x_1$ and $x_2$ in the new constraint.

For many problems, relaxing the equality of split variables allows the system to be broken down, enabling each subsystem to be solved separately. This significantly reduces computation time and memory usage. Solving the relaxed problem with variable splitting can give an approximate solution to the initial problem. Using an approximate solution as a "warm start" facilitates the iterative solving of the original problem with only the variable $x$.

This was first introduced by Jörnsten, Näsberg, and Smeds in 1985. At the same time, M. Guignard and S. Kim introduced the same idea under the name "Lagrangean Decomposition" (their papers appeared in 1987).

== Bibliography ==
- Adlers, Mikael; Björck, Åke (2000). "Matrix stretching for sparse least squares problems". Numerical Linear Algebra with Applications. 7 (2): 51–65. doi:10.1002/(sici)1099-1506(200003)7:2<51::aid-nla187>3.0.co;2-o. ISSN 1099-1506.
- Alvarado, Fernando (1997). "Matrix enlarging methods and their application". BIT Numerical Mathematics. 37 (3): 473–505. doi:10.1007/BF02510237. S2CID 120358431.
- Grcar, Joseph (1990). Matrix stretching for linear equations (Technical report). Sandia National Laboratories. arXiv:1203.2377. Bibcode:2012arXiv1203.2377G. SAND90-8723.
- Vanderbei, Robert J. (July 1991). "Splitting dense columns in sparse linear systems". Linear Algebra and Its Applications. 152: 107–117. doi:10.1016/0024-3795(91)90269-3. ISSN 0024-3795.
- Jörnsten, Kurt O.; Näsberg, Mikael; Smeds, Per A. (1985). "Variable Splitting: A New Lagrangean Relaxation Approach to Some Mathematical Programming Models". LiTH MAT R. 84–85. University of Linköping, Department of Mathematics: 1–52.
- Guignard, Monique; Kim, Siwhan (1987). "Lagrangean Decomposition: A Model Yielding Stronger Bounds". Mathematical Programming. 39 (2): 215–228. doi:10.1007/BF02592948. hdl:2027.42/6740.
