= Sides of an equation =

Mathematical nomenclature

In mathematics, LHS is informal shorthand for the left-hand side of an equation. Similarly, RHS is the right-hand side. The two sides have the same value, expressed differently, since equality is symmetric.

More generally, these terms may apply to an inequation or inequality; the right-hand side is everything on the right side of a test operator in an expression, with LHS defined similarly.

== Example ==
The expression on the right side of the "=" sign is the right side of the equation and the expression on the left of the "=" is the left side of the equation.

For example, in

$$x + 5 = y + 8$$

x + 5 is the left-hand side (LHS) and y + 8 is the right-hand side (RHS).

== Homogeneous and inhomogeneous equations ==
In solving mathematical equations, particularly linear simultaneous equations, differential equations and integral equations, the terminology homogeneous is often used for equations with some linear operator L on the LHS and 0 on the RHS. In contrast, an equation with a non-zero RHS is called inhomogeneous or non-homogeneous, as exemplified by

Lf = g,

with g a fixed function, which equation is to be solved for f. Then any solution of the inhomogeneous equation may have a solution of the homogeneous equation added to it, and still remain a solution.

For example in mathematical physics, the homogeneous equation may correspond to a physical theory formulated in empty space, while the inhomogeneous equation asks for more 'realistic' solutions with some matter, or charged particles.

== Syntax ==
More abstractly, when using infix notation

T * U

the term T stands as the left-hand side and U as the right-hand side of the operator *. This usage is less common, though.

== See also ==
- Equals sign
