= Elementary algebra =

Basic concepts of algebra

$\overset{}{\underset{}{ x=\frac{-b\pm\sqrt{b^2-4ac} }{2a} } }$
The quadratic formula, which is the solution to the quadratic equation $ax^2+bx+c=0$ where $a\neq0$. Here the symbols a, b, and c represent arbitrary numbers, and x is a variable which represents the solution of the equation.

Two-dimensional plot (red curve) of the algebraic equation $y = x^2 - x - 2$.

Elementary algebra, also known as high school algebra or college algebra, encompasses the basic concepts of algebra. It is often contrasted with arithmetic: arithmetic deals with specified numbers, whilst algebra introduces numerical variables (quantities without fixed values). In arithmetic, operations (such as addition and subtraction) can only be performed on numbers. In algebra, operations can be performed on numbers, variables, and terms. Unlike abstract algebra, elementary algebra is not concerned with algebraic structures outside the realm of real and complex numbers.

It is typically taught to secondary school students and at introductory college level in the United States, and builds on their understanding of arithmetic. The use of variables to denote quantities allows general relationships between quantities to be formally and concisely expressed, and thus enables solving a broader scope of problems. Many quantitative relationships in science and mathematics are expressed as algebraic equations.

== Algebraic operations ==
Algebraic operations in the solution to the quadratic equation. The radical sign √, denoting a square root, is equivalent to exponentiation to the power of 1/2. The ± sign means the equation can be written with either a + or a – sign.

In mathematics, a basic algebraic operation is a mathematical operation similar to any one of the common operations of elementary algebra, which include addition, subtraction, multiplication, division, raising to a whole number power, and taking roots (fractional power). The operations of elementary algebra may be performed on numbers, in which case they are often called arithmetic operations. They may also be performed, in a similar way, on variables, algebraic expressions, and more generally, on elements of algebraic structures, such as groups and fields.

An algebraic operation on a set $S$ may be defined more formally as a function that maps to $S$ the tuples of a given length of elements of $S$. The length of the tuples is called the arity of the operation, and each member of the tuple is called an operand. The most common case is the case of arity two, where the operation is called a binary operation and the operands form an ordered pair. A unary operation is an operation of arity one that has only one operand; for example, the square root. An example of a ternary operation (arity three) is the triple product.

The term algebraic operation may also be used for operations that may be defined by compounding basic algebraic operations, such as the dot product. In calculus and mathematical analysis, algebraic operation is also used for the operations that may be defined by purely algebraic methods. For example, exponentiation with an integer or rational exponent is an algebraic operation, but not the general exponentiation with a real or complex exponent. Also, the derivative is an operation that is not algebraic.

== Algebraic notation ==
Algebraic notation describes the rules and conventions for writing mathematical expressions, as well as the terminology used for talking about parts of expressions. For example, the expression $3x^2 - 2xy + c$ has the following components:

Algebraic expression notation: 1 – power (exponent) 2 – coefficient 3 – term 4 – operator 5 – constant term $c$ – constant $x$ $y$ – variables

A coefficient is a numerical value, or letter representing a numerical constant, that multiplies a variable (the operator is omitted). A term is an addend or a summand, a group of coefficients, variables, constants and exponents that may be separated from the other terms by the plus and minus operators. Letters represent variables and constants. By convention, letters at the beginning of the alphabet (e.g. $a, b, c$) are typically used to represent constants, and those toward the end of the alphabet (e.g. $x, y$ and z) are used to represent variables. They are usually printed in italics.

Algebraic operations work in the same way as arithmetic operations, such as addition, subtraction, multiplication, division and exponentiation, and are applied to algebraic variables and terms. Multiplication symbols are usually omitted, and implied when there is no space between two variables or terms, or when a coefficient is used. For example, $3 \times x^2$ is written as $3x^2$, and $2 \times x \times y$ may be written $2xy$.

Usually terms with the highest power (exponent), are written on the left, for example, $x^2$ is written to the left of x. When a coefficient is one, it is usually omitted (e.g. $1x^2$ is written $x^2$). Likewise when the exponent (power) is one, (e.g. $3x^1$ is written $3x$). When the exponent is zero, the result is always 1 (e.g. $x^0$ is always rewritten to 1). However $0^0$, being undefined, should not appear in an expression, and care should be taken in simplifying expressions in which variables may appear in exponents.

=== Alternative notation ===
Other types of notation are used in algebraic expressions when the required formatting is not available, or can not be implied, such as where only letters and symbols are available. As an illustration of this, while exponents are usually formatted using superscripts, e.g., $x^2$, in plain text, and in the TeX mark-up language, the caret symbol ^ represents exponentiation, so $x^2$ is written as "x^2". This also applies to some programming languages such as Lua. In programming languages such as Ada, Fortran, Perl, Python and Ruby, a double asterisk is used, so $x^2$ is written as "x**2". Many programming languages and calculators use a single asterisk to represent the multiplication symbol, and it must be explicitly used, for example, $3x$ is written "3*x".

== Concepts ==
=== Variables ===
Example of variables showing the relationship between a circle's diameter and its circumference. For any circle, its circumference c, divided by its diameter d, is equal to the constant pi, $\pi$ (approximately 3.14).

Elementary algebra builds on and extends arithmetic by introducing letters called variables to represent general (non-specified) numbers. This is useful for several reasons.

1. Variables may represent numbers whose values are not yet known. For example, if the temperature of the current day, C, is 20 degrees higher than the temperature of the previous day, P, then the problem can be described algebraically as $C = P + 20$.
2. Variables allow one to describe general problems, without specifying the values of the quantities that are involved. For example, it can be stated specifically that 5 minutes is equivalent to $60 \times 5 = 300$ seconds. A more general (algebraic) description may state that the number of seconds, $s = 60 \times m$, where m is the number of minutes.
3. Variables allow one to describe mathematical relationships between quantities that may vary. For example, the relationship between the circumference, c, and diameter, d, of a circle is described by $\pi = c /d$.
4. Variables allow one to describe some mathematical properties. For example, a basic property of addition is commutativity which states that the order of numbers being added together does not matter. Commutativity is stated algebraically as $(a + b) = (b + a)$.

=== Simplifying expressions ===
Algebraic expressions may be evaluated and simplified, based on the basic properties of arithmetic operations (addition, subtraction, multiplication, division and exponentiation). For example,

- Added terms are simplified using coefficients. For example, $x + x + x$ can be simplified as $3x$ (where 3 is a numerical coefficient).
- Multiplied terms are simplified using exponents. For example, $x \times x \times x$ is represented as $x^3$
- Like terms are added together, for example, $2x^2 + 3ab - x^2 + ab$ is written as $x^2 + 4ab$, because the terms containing $x^2$ are added together, and the terms containing $ab$ are added together.
- Brackets can be "multiplied out", using the distributive property. For example, $x (2x + 3)$ can be written as $(x \times 2x) + (x \times 3)$ which can be written as $2x^2 + 3x$
- Expressions can be factored. For example, $6x^5 + 3x^2$, by dividing both terms by the common factor, $3x^2$ can be written as $3x^2 (2x^3 + 1)$

=== Equations ===
Animation illustrating Pythagoras' rule for a right-angle triangle, which shows the algebraic relationship between the triangle's hypotenuse, and the other two sides.

An equation states that two expressions are equal using the symbol for equality, = (the equals sign). One of the best-known equations describes Pythagoras' law relating the length of the sides of a right angle triangle:

$$c^2 = a^2 + b^2$$

This equation states that $c^2$, representing the square of the length of the side that is the hypotenuse, the side opposite the right angle, is equal to the sum (addition) of the squares of the other two sides whose lengths are represented by a and b.

An equation is the claim that two expressions have the same value and are equal. Some equations are true for all values of the involved variables (such as $a + b = b + a$); such equations are called identities. Conditional equations are true for only some values of the involved variables, e.g. $x^2 - 1 = 8$ is true only for $x = 3$ and $x = -3$. The values of the variables which make the equation true are the solutions of the equation and can be found through equation solving.

Another type of equation is inequality. Inequalities are used to show that one side of the equation is greater, or less, than the other. The symbols used for this are: $a > b$ where $>$ represents 'greater than', and $a < b$ where $<$ represents 'less than'. Just like standard equality equations, numbers can be added, subtracted, multiplied or divided. The only exception is that when multiplying or dividing by a negative number, the inequality symbol must be flipped.

==== Properties of equality ====
By definition, equality is an equivalence relation, meaning it is reflexive (i.e. $b = b$), symmetric (i.e. if $a = b$ then $b = a$), and transitive (i.e. if $a = b$ and $b = c$ then $a = c$). It also satisfies the important property that if two symbols are used for equal things, then one symbol can be substituted for the other in any true statement about the first and the statement will remain true. This implies the following properties:

- if $a = b$ and $c = d$ then $a + c = b + d$ and $ac = bd$;
- if $a = b$ then $a + c = b + c$ and $ac = bc$;
- more generally, for any function f, if $a=b$ then $f(a) = f(b)$.

==== Properties of inequality ====
The relations less than $<$ and greater than $>$ have the property of transitivity:

- If $a < b$ and $b < c$ then $a < c$;
- If $a < b$ and $c < d$ then $a + c < b + d$;
- If $a < b$ and $c > 0$ then $ac < bc$;
- If $a < b$ and $c < 0$ then $bc < ac$.

By reversing the inequation, $<$ and $>$ can be swapped, for example:

- $a < b$ is equivalent to $b > a$

=== Substitution ===
Substitution is replacing the terms in an expression to create a new expression. Substituting 3 for a in the expression a*5 makes a new expression 3*5 with meaning 15. Substituting the terms of a statement makes a new statement. When the original statement is true independently of the values of the terms, the statement created by substitutions is also true. Hence, definitions can be made in symbolic terms and interpreted through substitution: if $a^2:=a\times a$ is meant as the definition of $a^2,$ as the product of a with itself, substituting 3 for a informs the reader of this statement that $3^2$ means 3 × 3 = 9. Often it's not known whether the statement is true independently of the values of the terms. And, substitution allows one to derive restrictions on the possible values, or show what conditions the statement holds under. For example, taking the statement x + 1 = 0, if x is substituted with 1, this implies 1 + 1 = 2 = 0, which is false, which implies that if x + 1 = 0 then x cannot be 1.

If x and y are integers, rationals, or real numbers, then xy = 0 implies x = 0 or y = 0. Consider abc = 0. Then, substituting a for x and bc for y, we learn a = 0 or bc = 0. Then we can substitute again, letting x = b and y = c, to show that if bc = 0 then b = 0 or c = 0. Therefore, if abc = 0, then a = 0 or (b = 0 or c = 0), so abc = 0 implies a = 0 or b = 0 or c = 0.

If the original fact were stated as "ab = 0 implies a = 0 or b = 0", then when saying "consider abc = 0," we would have a conflict of terms when substituting. Yet the above logic is still valid to show that if abc = 0 then a = 0 or b = 0 or c = 0 if, instead of letting a = a and b = bc, one substitutes a for a and b for bc (and with bc = 0, substituting b for a and c for b). This shows that substituting for the terms in a statement isn't always the same as letting the terms from the statement equal the substituted terms. In this situation it's clear that if we substitute an expression a into the a term of the original equation, the a substituted does not refer to the a in the statement "ab = 0 implies a = 0 or b = 0."

== Solving algebraic equations ==
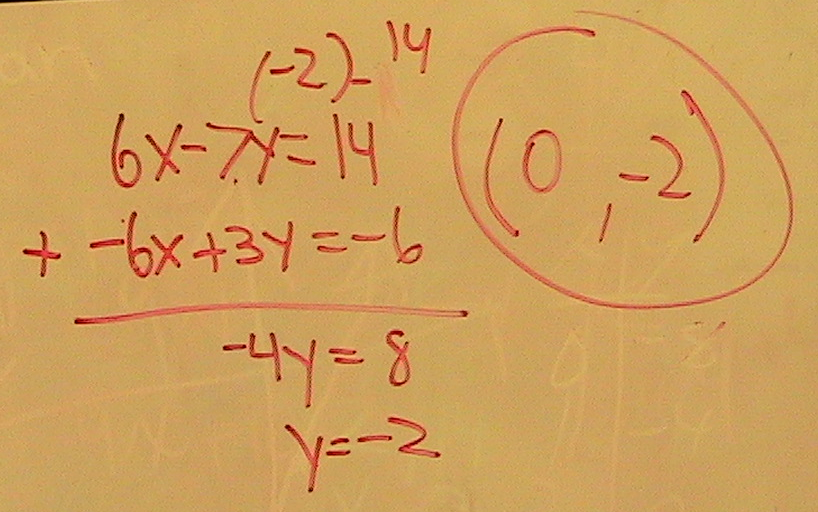
A typical algebra problem.

The following sections lay out examples of some of the types of algebraic equations that may be encountered.

=== Linear equations with one variable ===
Linear equations are so-called, because when they are plotted, they describe a straight line. The simplest equations to solve are linear equations that have only one variable. They contain only constant numbers and a single variable without an exponent. As an example, consider:

Problem in words: If you double the age of a child and add 4, the resulting answer is 12. How old is the child?

Equivalent equation: $2x + 4 = 12$ where x represent the child's age

To solve this kind of equation, the technique is add, subtract, multiply, or divide both sides of the equation by the same number in order to isolate the variable on one side of the equation. Once the variable is isolated, the other side of the equation is the value of the variable. This problem and its solution are as follows:

Solving for x

1. Equation to solve:	$2x + 4 = 12$
2. Subtract 4 from both sides:	$2x + 4 - 4 = 12 - 4$
3. This simplifies to:	$2x = 8$
4. Divide both sides by 2:	$\frac{2x}{2} = \frac{8}{2}$
5. This simplifies to the solution:	$x = 4$

In words: the child is 4 years old.

The general form of a linear equation with one variable, can be written as: $ax+b=c$

Following the same procedure (i.e. subtract b from both sides, and then divide by a), the general solution is given by $x=\frac{c-b}{a}$

=== Linear equations with two variables ===
Solving two linear equations with a unique solution at the point that they intersect.

A linear equation with two variables has many (i.e. an infinite number of) solutions. For example:

Problem in words: A father is 22 years older than his son. How old are they?
Equivalent equation: $y = x + 22$ where y is the father's age, x is the son's age.

That cannot be worked out by itself. If the son's age was made known, then there would no longer be two unknowns (variables). The problem then becomes a linear equation with just one variable, that can be solved as described above.

To solve a linear equation with two variables (unknowns), requires two related equations. For example, if it was also revealed that:

Problem in words
In 10 years, the father will be twice as old as his son.
Equivalent equation
$$\begin{align}
y + 10 &= 2 \times (x + 10)\\
y &= 2 \times (x + 10) - 10 && \text{Subtract 10 from both sides}\\
y &= 2x + 20 - 10 && \text{Multiple out brackets}\\
y &= 2x + 10 && \text{Simplify}
\end{align}$$

Now there are two related linear equations, each with two unknowns, which enables the production of a linear equation with just one variable, by subtracting one from the other (called the elimination method):

$$\begin{cases}
y = x + 22 & \text{First equation}\\
y = 2x + 10 & \text{Second equation}
\end{cases}$$
$$\begin{align}
&&&\text{Subtract the first equation from}\\
(y - y) &= (2x - x) +10 - 22 && \text{the second in order to remove } y\\
0 &= x - 12 && \text{Simplify}\\
12 &= x && \text{Add 12 to both sides}\\
x &= 12 && \text{Rearrange}
\end{align}$$

In other words, the son is aged 12, and since the father 22 years older, he must be 34. In 10 years, the son will be 22, and the father will be twice his age, 44. This problem is illustrated on the associated plot of the equations.

For other ways to solve this kind of equations, see below, System of linear equations.

=== Quadratic equations ===
Quadratic equation plot of $y = x^2 + 3x - 10$ showing its roots at $x = -5$ and $x = 2$, and that the quadratic can be rewritten as $y = (x + 5)(x - 2)$

A quadratic equation is one which includes a term with an exponent of 2, for example, $x^2$, and no term with higher exponent. The name derives from the Latin quadrus, meaning square. In general, a quadratic equation can be expressed in the form $ax^2 + bx + c = 0$, where a is not zero (if it were zero, then the equation would not be quadratic but linear). Because of this a quadratic equation must contain the term $ax^2$, which is known as the quadratic term. Hence $a \neq 0$, and so we may divide by a and rearrange the equation into the standard form

$$x^2 + px + q = 0$$

where $p = \frac{b}{a}$ and $q = \frac{c}{a}$. Solving this, by a process known as completing the square, leads to the quadratic formula

$$x=\frac{-b \pm \sqrt {b^2-4ac}}{2a},$$

where the symbol "±" indicates that both

$$x=\frac{-b + \sqrt {b^2-4ac}}{2a}\quad\text{and}\quad x=\frac{-b - \sqrt {b^2-4ac}}{2a}$$

are solutions of the quadratic equation.

Quadratic equations can also be solved using factorization (the reverse process of which is expansion, but for two linear terms is sometimes denoted foiling). As an example of factoring:

$$x^{2} + 3x - 10 = 0,$$

which is the same thing as

$$(x + 5)(x - 2) = 0.$$

It follows from the zero-product property that either $x = 2$ or $x = -5$ are the solutions, since precisely one of the factors must be equal to zero. All quadratic equations will have two solutions in the complex number system, but need not have any in the real number system. For example,

$$x^{2} + 1 = 0$$

has no real number solution since no real number squared equals −1. Sometimes a quadratic equation has a root of multiplicity 2, such as:

$$(x + 1)^2 = 0.$$

For this equation, −1 is a root of multiplicity 2. This means −1 appears twice, since the equation can be rewritten in factored form as

$$[x-(-1)][x-(-1)]=0.$$

==== Complex numbers ====
All quadratic equations have exactly two solutions in complex numbers (but they may be equal to each other), a category that includes real numbers, imaginary numbers, and sums of real and imaginary numbers. Complex numbers first arise in the teaching of quadratic equations and the quadratic formula. For example, the quadratic equation

$$x^2+x+1=0$$

has solutions

$$x=\frac{-1 + \sqrt{-3}}{2}  \quad \quad \text{and} \quad \quad x=\frac{-1-\sqrt{-3}}{2}.$$

Since $\sqrt{-3}$ is not any real number, both of these solutions for x are complex numbers.

=== Exponential and logarithmic equations ===
The graph of the logarithm to base 2 crosses the x axis (horizontal axis) at 1 and passes through the points with coordinates (2, 1), (4, 2), and (8, 3). For example, log_{2}(8) = 3, because 2^{3} = 8. The graph gets arbitrarily close to the y axis, but does not meet or intersect it.

An exponential equation is one which has the form $a^x = b$ for $a > 0$, which has solution

$$x = \log_a b = \frac{\ln b}{\ln a}$$

when $b > 0$. Elementary algebraic techniques are used to rewrite a given equation in the above way before arriving at the solution. For example, if

$$3 \cdot 2^{x - 1} + 1 = 10$$

then, by subtracting 1 from both sides of the equation, and then dividing both sides by 3 we obtain

$$2^{x - 1} = 3$$

whence

$$x - 1 = \log_2 3$$

or

$$x = \log_2 3 + 1.$$

A logarithmic equation is an equation of the form $log_a(x) = b$ for $a > 0$, which has solution

$$x = a^b.$$

For example, if

$$4\log_5(x - 3) - 2 = 6$$

then, by adding 2 to both sides of the equation, followed by dividing both sides by 4, we get

$$\log_5(x - 3) = 2$$

whence

$$x - 3 = 5^2 = 25$$

from which we obtain

$$x = 28.$$

=== Radical equations ===
$\overset{}{\underset{}{\sqrt[2]{x^3} \equiv x^{\frac 3 2} } }$
Radical equation showing two ways to represent the same expression. The triple bar means the equation is true for all values of x

A radical equation is one that includes a radical sign, which includes square roots, $\sqrt{x},$ cube roots, $\sqrt[3]{x}$, and nth roots, $\sqrt[n]{x}$. Recall that an nth root can be rewritten in exponential format, so that $\sqrt[n]{x}$ is equivalent to $x^{\frac{1}{n}}$. Combined with regular exponents (powers), then $\sqrt[2]{x^3}$ (the square root of x cubed), can be rewritten as $x^{\frac{3}{2}}$. So a common form of a radical equation is $\sqrt[n]{x^m}=a$ (equivalent to $x^\frac{m}{n}=a$) where m and n are integers. It has real solution(s):

n is odd	n is even and $a \ge 0$	n and m are even and $a<0$	n is even, m is odd, and $a<0$
$x = \sqrt[n]{a^m}$ equivalently $$x = \left(\sqrt[n]a\right)^m$$	$x = \pm \sqrt[n]{a^m}$ equivalently $$x = \pm \left(\sqrt[n]a\right)^m$$	$x=\pm \sqrt[n]{a^m}$	no real solution

For example, if:

$$(x + 5)^{2/3} = 4$$

then

$$\begin{align}
x + 5 & = \pm (\sqrt{4})^3,\\
x + 5 & = \pm 8,\\
x &  = -5 \pm 8,
\end{align}$$

and thus

$$x = 3 \quad \text{or}\quad x = -13$$

=== System of linear equations ===
There are different methods to solve a system of linear equations with two variables.

==== Elimination method ====
The solution set for the equations $x - y = -1$ and $3x + y = 9$ is the single point (2, 3).

An example of solving a system of linear equations is by using the elimination method:

$$\begin{cases}4x + 2y&= 14 \\
2x - y&= 1.\end{cases}$$

Multiplying the terms in the second equation by 2:

$$4x + 2y = 14$$
$$4x - 2y = 2.$$

Adding the two equations together to get:

$$8x = 16$$

which simplifies to

$$x = 2.$$

Since the fact that $x = 2$ is known, it is then possible to deduce that $y = 3$ by either of the original two equations (by using 2 instead of x ) The full solution to this problem is then

$$\begin{cases} x = 2 \\ y = 3. \end{cases}$$

This is not the only way to solve this specific system; y could have been resolved before x.

==== Substitution method ====
Another way of solving the same system of linear equations is by substitution.

$$\begin{cases}4x + 2y &= 14
\\ 2x - y &= 1.\end{cases}$$

An equivalent for y can be deduced by using one of the two equations. Using the second equation:

$$2x - y = 1$$

Subtracting $2x$ from each side of the equation:

$$\begin{align}2x - 2x - y & = 1 - 2x  \\
- y & = 1 - 2x
\end{align}$$

and multiplying by −1:

$$y = 2x - 1.$$

Using this y value in the first equation in the original system:

$$\begin{align}4x + 2(2x - 1) &= 14\\
4x + 4x - 2 &= 14 \\
8x - 2 &= 14 \end{align}$$

Adding 2 on each side of the equation:

$$\begin{align}8x - 2 + 2 &= 14 + 2 \\
8x &= 16 \end{align}$$

which simplifies to

$$x = 2$$

Using this value in one of the equations, the same solution as in the previous method is obtained.

$$\begin{cases} x = 2 \\ y = 3. \end{cases}$$

This is not the only way to solve this specific system; in this case as well, y could have been solved before x.

=== Other types of systems of linear equations ===
==== Inconsistent systems ====
The equations $3x + 2y = 6$ and $3x + 2y = 12$ are parallel and cannot intersect, and is unsolvable.

Plot of a quadratic equation (red) and a linear equation (blue) that do not intersect, and consequently for which there is no common solution.

In the above example, a solution exists. However, there are also systems of equations which do not have any solution. Such a system is called inconsistent. An obvious example is

$$\begin{cases}\begin{align} x + y &= 1 \\
0x + 0y &= 2\,. \end{align} \end{cases}$$

As 0≠2, the second equation in the system has no solution. Therefore, the system has no solution. However, not all inconsistent systems are recognized at first sight. As an example, consider the system

$$\begin{cases}\begin{align}4x + 2y &= 12 \\
-2x - y &= -4\,. \end{align}\end{cases}$$

Multiplying by 2 both sides of the second equation, and adding it to the first one results in

$$0x+0y = 4 \,,$$

which clearly has no solution.

==== Undetermined systems ====
There are also systems which have infinitely many solutions, in contrast to a system with a unique solution (meaning, a unique pair of values for x and y) For example:

$$\begin{cases}\begin{align}4x + 2y & = 12 \\
-2x - y & = -6 \end{align}\end{cases}$$

Isolating y in the second equation:

$$y = -2x + 6$$

And using this value in the first equation in the system:

$$\begin{align}4x + 2(-2x + 6) = 12 \\
4x - 4x + 12 = 12 \\
12 = 12 \end{align}$$

The equality is true, but it does not provide a value for x. Indeed, one can easily verify (by just filling in some values of x) that for any x there is a solution as long as $y = -2x + 6$. There is an infinite number of solutions for this system.

==== Over- and underdetermined systems ====
Systems with more variables than the number of linear equations are called underdetermined. Such a system, if it has any solutions, does not have a unique one but rather an infinitude of them. An example of such a system is

$$\begin{cases}\begin{align}x + 2y & = 10\\
y - z  & = 2 .\end{align}\end{cases}$$

When trying to solve it, one is led to express some variables as functions of the other ones if any solutions exist, but cannot express all solutions numerically because there are an infinite number of them if there are any.

A system with a higher number of equations than variables is called overdetermined. If an overdetermined system has any solutions, necessarily some equations are linear combinations of the others.

== See also ==
- History of algebra
- Binary operation
- Gaussian elimination
- Mathematics education
- Number line
- Polynomial
- Cancelling out
- Tarski's high school algebra problem
