= Cancelling out =

Mathematical process used for removing subexpressions from a mathematical expression

Cancelling out is a mathematical process used for removing subexpressions from a mathematical expression, when this removal does not change the meaning or the value of the expression because the subexpressions have equal and opposing effects. For example, a fraction is put in lowest terms by cancelling out the common factors of the numerator and the denominator. As another example, if a×b=a×c, then the multiplicative term a can be canceled out if a≠0, resulting in the equivalent expression b=c; this is equivalent to dividing through by a.

== Cancelling ==
If the subexpressions are not identical, then it may still be possible to cancel them out partly. For example, in the simple equation 3 + 2y = 8y, both sides actually contain 2y (because 8y is the same as 2y + 6y). Therefore, the 2y on both sides can be cancelled out, leaving 3 = 6y, or y = 0.5. This is equivalent to subtracting 2y from both sides.

At times, cancelling out can introduce limited changes or extra solutions to an equation. For example, given the inequality ab ≥ 3b, it looks like the b on both sides can be cancelled out to give a ≥ 3 as the solution. But cancelling 'naively' like this, will mean we don't get all the solutions (sets of (a, b) satisfying the inequality). This is because if b were a negative number then dividing by a negative would change the ≥ relationship into a ≤ relationship. For example, although 2 is more than 1, –2 is less than –1. Also if b were zero then zero times anything is zero and cancelling out would mean dividing by zero in that case which cannot be done. So in fact, while cancelling works, cancelling out correctly will lead us to three sets of solutions, not just one we thought we had. It will also tell us that our 'naive' solution is only a solution in some cases, not all cases:

- If b > 0: we can cancel out to get a ≥ 3.
- If b < 0: then cancelling out gives a ≤ 3 instead, because we would have to reverse the relationship in this case.
- If b is exactly zero: then the equation is true for any value of a, because both sides would be zero, and 0 ≥ 0.

So some care may be needed to ensure that cancelling out is done correctly and no solutions are overlooked or incorrect. Our simple inequality has three sets of solutions, which are:

- b > 0 and a ≥ 3. (For example b = 5 and a = 6 is a solution because 6 x 5 is 30 and 3 x 5 is 15, and 30 ≥ 15)
  or
- b < 0 and a ≤ 3 (For example b = –5 and a = 2 is a solution because 2 x (–5) is –10 and 3 x (–5) is –15, and –10 ≥ –15)
  or
- b = 0 (and a can be any number) (because anything x zero ≥ 3 x zero)

Our 'naïve' solution (that a ≥ 3) would also be wrong sometimes. For example, if b = –5 then a = 4 is not a solution even though 4 ≥ 3, because 4 × (–5) is –20, and 3 x (–5) is –15, and –20 is not ≥ –15.

== In advanced and abstract algebra, and infinite series ==
In more advanced mathematics, cancelling out can be used in the context of infinite series, whose terms can be cancelled out to get a finite sum or a convergent series. In this case, the term telescoping is often used. Considerable care and prevention of errors is often necessary to ensure the amended equation will be valid, or to establish the bounds within which it will be valid, because of the nature of such series.

== Related concepts and use in other fields ==
In computational science, cancelling out is often used for improving the accuracy and the execution time of numerical algorithms.

== See also ==
- Al-Jabr
- Elementary algebra
- Equation
