= Constraint counting =

In mathematics, constraint counting is counting the number of constraints in order to compare it with the number of variables, parameters, etc. that are free to be determined, the idea being that in most cases the number of independent choices that can be made is the excess of the latter over the former.

For example, in linear algebra if the number of constraints (independent equations) in a system of linear equations equals the number of unknowns then precisely one solution exists; if there are fewer independent equations than unknowns, an infinite number of solutions exists; and if the number of independent equations exceeds the number of unknowns, then no solutions exist.

In the context of partial differential equations, constraint counting is a crude but often useful way of counting the number of free functions needed to specify a solution to a partial differential equation.

== Partial differential equations ==
Consider a second order partial differential equation in three variables, such as the two-dimensional wave equation

$$u_{tt} = u_{xx} + u_{yy}.$$

It is often profitable to think of such an equation as a rewrite rule allowing us to rewrite arbitrary partial derivatives of the function $u(t,x,y)$ using fewer partials than would be needed for an arbitrary function. For example, if $u$ satisfies the wave equation, we can rewrite

$$u_{tyt} = u_{tty} = u_{xxy} + u_{yyy}$$

where in the first equality, we appealed to the fact that partial derivatives commute.

=== Linear equations ===
To answer this in the important special case of a linear partial differential equation, Einstein asked: how many of the partial derivatives of a solution can be linearly independent? It is convenient to record his answer using an ordinary generating function

$$s(\xi) = \sum_{k=0}^\infty s_k \xi^k$$

where $s_k$ is a natural number counting the number of linearly independent partial derivatives (of order k) of an arbitrary function in the solution space of the equation in question.

Whenever a function satisfies some partial differential equation, we can use the corresponding rewrite rule to eliminate some of them, because further mixed partials have necessarily become linearly dependent. Specifically, the power series counting the variety of arbitrary functions of three variables (no constraints) is

$$f(\xi) =  \frac{1}{(1-\xi)^3} = 1 + 3 \xi + 6 \xi^2 + 10 \xi^3 + \dots$$

but the power series counting those in the solution space of some second order p.d.e. is

$$g(\xi) = \frac{1-\xi^2}{(1-\xi)^3} = 1 + 2 \xi + 5 \xi^2 + 7 \xi^3 + \dots$$

which records that we can eliminate one second order partial $u_{tt}$, three third order partials $u_{ttt}, \, u_{ttx}, \, u_{tty}$, and so forth.

More generally, the o.g.f. for an arbitrary function of n variables is

$$s[n](\xi) = 1/(1-\xi)^n = 1 + n \, \xi + \left( \begin{matrix} n \\ 2 \end{matrix} \right) \, \xi^2 + \left( \begin{matrix} n+1 \\ 3 \end{matrix} \right) \, \xi^3 + \dots$$

where the coefficients of the infinite power series of the generating function are constructed using an appropriate infinite sequence of binomial coefficients, and the power series for a function required to satisfy a linear m-th order equation is

$$g(\xi) = \frac{1-\xi^m}{(1-\xi)^n}$$

Next,

$$\frac{1-\xi^2}{(1-\xi)^3} = \frac{1 + \xi}{(1-\xi)^2}$$

which can be interpreted to predict that a solution to a second order linear p.d.e. in three variables is expressible by two freely chosen functions of two variables, one of which is used immediately, and the second, only after taking a first derivative, in order to express the solution.

=== General solution of initial value problem ===
To verify this prediction, recall the solution of the initial value problem

$$u_{tt} = u_{xx} + u_{yy}, \; u(0,x,y) = p(x,y), \; u_t(0,x,y) = q(x,y)$$

Applying the Laplace transform $u(t,x,y) \mapsto [Lu](\omega,x,y)$ gives

$$-\omega^2 \, [Lu] + \omega \, p(x,y) + q(x,y) + [Lu]_x + [Lu]_y$$

Applying the Fourier transform $[Lu](\omega,x,y) \mapsto [FLU](\omega,m,n)$ to the two spatial variables gives

$$-\omega^2 \, [FLu] + \omega \, [Fp] + [Fq] - (m^2+n^2) \, [FLu]$$

or

$$[FLu](\omega,m,n) = \frac{ \omega \, [Fp](m,n) + [Fq](m,n)}{\omega^2 + m^2 + n^2}$$

Applying the inverse Laplace transform gives

$$[Fu](t,m,n) = [Fp](m,n) \, \cos( \sqrt{m^2+n^2} \, t ) + \frac{ [Fq](m,n) \, \sin (\sqrt{m^2+n^2} \, t) }{\sqrt{m^2+n^2}}$$

Applying the inverse Fourier transform gives

$$u(t,x,y) = Q(t,x,y) + P_t(t,x,y)$$

where

$$P(t,x,y) = \frac{1}{2\pi} \, \int_{(x-x')^2 + (y-y')^2 < t^2} \frac{p(x',y') \, dx' dy'}{ \left[ t^2-(x-x')^2-(y-y')^2 \right]^{1/2}}$$
$$Q(t,x,y) = \frac{1}{2\pi} \, \int_{(x-x')^2 + (y-y')^2 < t^2} \frac{q(x',y') \, dx' dy'}{ \left[ t^2-(x-x')^2-(y-y')^2 \right]^{1/2}}$$

Here, p,q are arbitrary (sufficiently smooth) functions of two variables, so (due their modest time dependence) the integrals P,Q also count as "freely chosen" functions of two variables; as promised, one of them is differentiated once before adding to the other to express the general solution of the initial value problem for the two dimensional wave equation.

=== Quasilinear equations ===
In the case of a nonlinear equation, it will only rarely be possible to obtain the general solution in closed form. However, if the equation is quasilinear (linear in the highest order derivatives), then we can still obtain approximate information similar to the above: specifying a member of the solution space will be "modulo nonlinear quibbles" equivalent to specifying a certain number of functions in a smaller number of variables. The number of these functions is the Einstein strength of the p.d.e. In the simple example above, the strength is two, although in this case we were able to obtain more precise information.
