= Coefficient matrix =

Matrix whose entries are the coefficients of a linear equation

In linear algebra, a coefficient matrix is a matrix consisting of the coefficients of the variables in a set of linear equations. The matrix is used in solving systems of linear equations.

== Coefficient matrix ==
In general, a system with m linear equations and n unknowns can be written as
$$\begin{align}
a_{11} x_1 + a_{12} x_2 + \cdots + a_{1n} x_n &= b_1 \\
a_{21} x_1 + a_{22} x_2 + \cdots + a_{2n} x_n &= b_2 \\
&\;\; \vdots \\
a_{m1} x_1 + a_{m2} x_2 + \cdots + a_{mn} x_n &= b_m
\end{align}$$

where $x_1, x_2, \ldots, x_n$ are the unknowns and the numbers $a_{11}, a_{12}, \ldots, a_{mn}$ are the coefficients of the system. The coefficient matrix is the m × n matrix with the coefficient a_{ij} as the (i, j)th entry:
$$\begin{bmatrix}
a_{11} & a_{12} & \cdots & a_{1n} \\
a_{21} & a_{22} &\cdots & a_{2n} \\
\vdots & \vdots & \ddots & \vdots \\
a_{m1} & a_{m2} & \cdots & a_{mn} \end{bmatrix}$$

Then the above set of equations can be expressed more succinctly as

$$A\mathbf{x} = \mathbf{b}$$

where A is the coefficient matrix and b is the column vector of constant terms.

== Relation of its properties to properties of the equation system ==
By the Rouché–Capelli theorem, the system of equations is inconsistent, meaning it has no solutions, if the rank of the augmented matrix (the coefficient matrix augmented with an additional column consisting of the vector b) is greater than the rank of the coefficient matrix. If, on the other hand, the ranks of these two matrices are equal, the system must have at least one solution. The solution is unique if and only if the rank r equals the number n of variables. Otherwise the general solution has n – r free parameters; hence in such a case there are an infinitude of solutions, which can be found by imposing arbitrary values on n – r of the variables and solving the resulting system for its unique solution; different choices of which variables to fix, and different fixed values of them, give different system solutions.

== Dynamic equations ==
A first-order matrix difference equation with constant term can be written as

$$\mathbf{y}_{t+1} = A \mathbf{y}_t + \mathbf{c},$$

where A is n × n and y and c are n × 1. This system converges to its steady-state level of y if and only if the absolute values of all n eigenvalues of A are less than 1.

A first-order matrix differential equation with constant term can be written as

$$\frac{d\mathbf{y}}{dt} = A\mathbf{y}(t) + \mathbf{c}.$$

This system is stable if and only if all n eigenvalues of A have negative real parts.
