= Convolutional deep belief network =

In computer science, a convolutional deep belief network (CDBN) is a type of deep artificial neural network composed of multiple layers of convolutional restricted Boltzmann machines stacked together. Alternatively, it is a hierarchical generative model for deep learning, which is highly effective in image processing and object recognition, though it has been used in other domains too. The salient features of the model include the fact that it scales well to high-dimensional images and is translation-invariant.

CDBNs use the technique of probabilistic max-pooling to reduce the dimensions in higher layers in the network. Training of the network involves a pre-training stage accomplished in a greedy layer-wise manner, similar to other deep belief networks. Depending on whether the network is to be used for discrimination or generative tasks, it is then "fine tuned" or trained with either back-propagation or the up–down algorithm (contrastive–divergence), respectively.
