= Deep network =

Deep network may refer to

- Deep belief network
- Deep neural network
