= Peter Dayan =

Researcher in computational neuroscience

Peter Dayan FRS
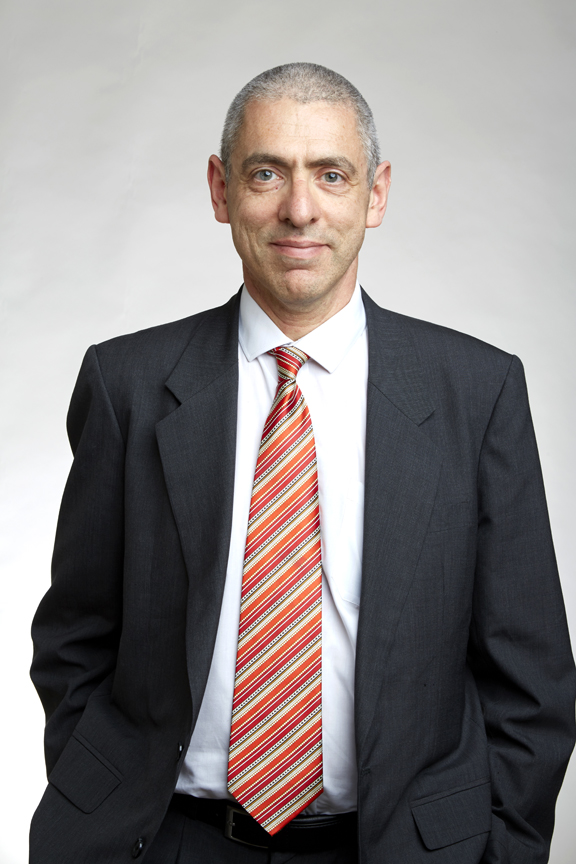
- Royal Society 2018
- Education: University of Cambridge (BA); University of Edinburgh (PhD)
- Known for: proposing dopamine for reward prediction error, and developing Q-learning
- Spouse: Li Zhaoping
- Awards: Rumelhart Prize (2012); The Brain Prize (2017)
- Scientific career
- Fields: Computational neuroscience Reinforcement learning
- Workplaces: Max Planck Institute for Biological Cybernetics; University College London; Massachusetts Institute of Technology; Uber; University of Toronto; Salk Institute
- Thesis: Reinforcing connectionism : learning the statistical way (1991)
- Doctoral advisor: David Willshaw
- Website: www.kyb.tuebingen.mpg.de/person/95844/251691

Peter Dayan FRS is a British neuroscientist and computer scientist who is director at the Max Planck Institute for Biological Cybernetics in Tübingen, Germany. He has pioneered the field of reinforcement learning (RL) where he and his colleagues proposed that dopamine signals reward prediction error, and helped develop the Q-learning algorithm. He is co-author of Theoretical Neuroscience, an influential textbook on computational neuroscience. He is also known for applying Bayesian methods from machine learning and artificial intelligence to understand neural function, and is particularly recognized for relating neurotransmitter levels to prediction errors and Bayesian uncertainties. He made contributions to unsupervised learning, including the wake-sleep algorithm for neural networks and the Helmholtz machine.

== Education ==
Dayan studied mathematics at the University of Cambridge and then continued for a PhD in artificial intelligence at the University of Edinburgh School of Informatics on statistical learning supervised by David Willshaw and David Wallace, focusing on associative memory and reinforcement learning.

== Career and research ==
After his PhD, Dayan held postdoctoral research positions with Terry Sejnowski at the Salk Institute and Geoffrey Hinton at the University of Toronto. He then took up an assistant professor position at the Massachusetts Institute of Technology (MIT), and moved to the Gatsby Charitable Foundation computational neuroscience unit at University College London (UCL) in 1998, becoming professor and director in 2002. In September 2018, the Max Planck Society announced his appointment as a director at the Max Planck Institute for Biological Cybernetics in Tübingen.

=== Awards and honours ===
Dayan was elected a Fellow of the Royal Society (FRS) in 2018. In 2023, he was elected a member of the Academia Europaea. He was awarded the Rumelhart Prize in 2012 and The Brain Prize in 2017.

== See also ==
- Helmholtz machine
