= Kunihiko Fukushima =

Japanese computer scientist (born 1936)

- Born: 16 March 1936 (age 90); Japanese Taiwan
- Citizenship: Japan
- Education: Kyoto University
- Known for: Artificial neural networks, Neocognitron, Convolutional neural network architecture, Unsupervised learning, Deep learning, ReLU activation function
- Awards: IEICE Achievement Award and Excellent Paper Awards; IEEE Neural Networks Pioneer Award; APNNA Outstanding Achievement Award; JNNS Excellent Paper Award; INNS Helmholtz Award; Bower Award and Prize for Achievement in Science
- Scientific career
- Fields: Computer science
- Workplaces: Fuzzy Logic Systems Institute

Kunihiko Fukushima (Japanese: 福島 邦彦, born 16 March 1936) is a Japanese computer scientist, most noted for his work on artificial neural networks and deep learning. He is currently working part-time as a senior research scientist at the Fuzzy Logic Systems Institute in Fukuoka, Japan.

== Notable scientific achievements ==
In 1980, Fukushima published the neocognitron, the original deep convolutional neural network (CNN) architecture. Fukushima proposed several supervised and unsupervised learning algorithms to train the parameters of a deep neocognitron such that it could learn internal representations of incoming data. Today, however, the CNN architecture is usually trained through backpropagation. This approach is now heavily used in computer vision.

In 1969 Fukushima introduced the ReLU (Rectifier Linear Unit) activation function in the context of visual feature extraction in hierarchical neural networks, which he called "analog threshold element". (Though the ReLU was first used by Alston Householder in 1941 as a mathematical abstraction of biological neural networks.) As of 2017 it is the most popular activation function for deep neural networks.

== Education and career ==
In 1958, Fukushima received his Bachelor of Engineering in electronics from Kyoto University. He became a senior research scientist at the NHK Science & Technology Research Laboratories. In 1989, he joined the faculty of Osaka University. In 1999, he joined the faculty of the University of Electro-Communications. In 2001, he joined the faculty of Tokyo University of Technology. From 2006 to 2010, he was a visiting professor at Kansai University.

Fukushima acted as founding president of the Japanese Neural Network Society (JNNS). He also was a founding member on the board of governors of the International Neural Network Society (INNS), and president of the Asia-Pacific Neural Network Assembly (APNNA). He was one of the board of governors of the International Neural Network Society (INNS) in 1989-1990 and 1993-2005.

== Awards ==
In 2020, Fukushima received the Bower Award and Prize for Achievement in Science. In 2022, Fukushima became a laureate of the Asian Scientist 100 by the Asian Scientist. He also received the IEICE Achievement Award and Excellent Paper Awards, the IEEE Neural Networks Pioneer Award, the APNNA Outstanding Achievement Award, the JNNS Excellent Paper Award and the INNS Helmholtz Award.
