= Rainer Mühlhoff =

German philosopher of digital media

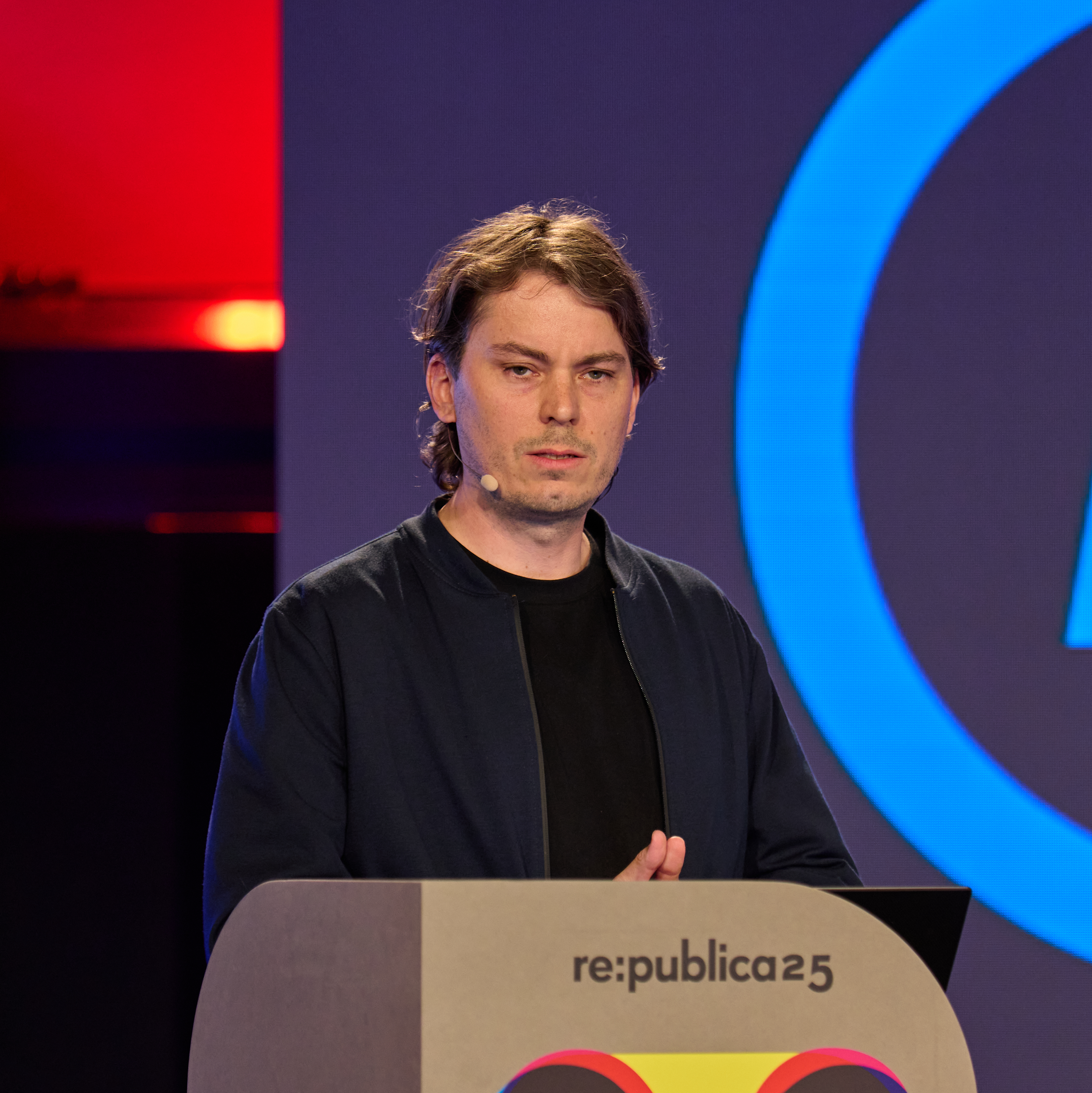
Mühlhoff in 2025

Rainer Mühlhoff (born 1982) is a German philosopher, mathematician and full professor for ethics of artificial intelligence at Osnabrück University, Germany.

== Career ==
Rainer Mühlhoff studied mathematics, theoretical physics and computer science at the Universities of Heidelberg, Münster and Leipzig. His thesis was on “Higher Spinfields on Curved Spacetimes”. Afterwards he continued his studies in philosophy, gender studies and German literature in Berlin. He earned a PhD in philosophy from Free University of Berlin in 2016 with a dissertation on affect theory after Spinoza and Foucault. His work, which focused on post-structuralism, continental philosophy and critical social theory, was supervised by Jan Slaby and Martin Saar. He then worked as a research fellow at the Free University of Berlin and at Technische Universität Berlin. In 2021 he became full professor for ethics of artificial intelligence at Osnabrück University. He holds the first professorship focused on the interdisciplinary field of “Ethics of Artificial Intelligence” in Germany.

In 2022, Mühlhoff was co-author of the data protection impact assessment of the German COVID-19 app “Corona-Warn-App”, which contributed in sparking a debate on the necessity and security of contact-tracing apps in Germany.

== Research Focus ==
Mühlhoff's research focuses on critical philosophy of digital media and social philosophy as well as ethics and critique of the digital society, big data and artificial intelligence. He has published works on privacy and data protection, intersectionality, and anti-discrimination in the context of digital technology and has an interdisciplinary approach. His philosophical approach is greatly influenced by post-structuralism and connects technology, power and subjectivity.

== Positions ==
=== Human-Aided AI ===
Mühlhoff views machine learning systems as sociotechnical systems. According to his position, the commercial application of machine learning is structurally dependent on human participation. Unpaid labor by both users of AI systems and click workers are used by tech companies. When training AI models, media systems of human-computer interaction are deliberately designed in such a way that users produce data, like with CAPTCHAs. Current commercial AI systems would therefore not replace human intelligence but rather “capture” it.

=== Predictive Privacy ===
Mühlhoff is known for his works on data privacy in the context of artificial intelligence. In his works, he points at the societal consequences of “predictive analysis”, meaning the usage of machine learning models for the prediction of personal or unknown information about individuals: “One of the main concerns related to automated decision making based on PA [predictive analytics] is the potential contribution of this technology to stabilizing or even increasing social and economic inequalities and power differentials within societies“. According to Mühlhoff, privacy is endangered by this kind of AI applications, because predictive analytics can estimate personal information about random individuals, even some that the individual may not know themselves (e.g. disease prediction). To allow a public debate about the topic, the known value of privacy should be expanded to include “predictive privacy”. Mühlhoff suggests to include predicted or estimated information as a possible violation of privacy and not only information that an individual has willingly given somewhere. It would be irrelevant for a “predictive violation of privacy” whether the predicted information is correct, as long as the predictions are used to treat individuals differently or to make automated decisions, for example. This would differentiate the concept of predictive privacy from neighboring concepts like “group privacy”. Mühlhoff asserts that data privacy needs to be thought collectively, since the possibilities of predictive analytics are based on the sharing of data by a sufficient number of users in their day-to-day usage of digital products. This would mean that one's own data influences others through predictive analytics.

=== Digital Counter-Enlightenment ===
In his works on user experience (UX) design, Mühlhoff diagnoses that the current evolution of digital interfaces takes away control and knowledge from the users and goes contrary to enlightened ideas of freedom and self-determination of the individual. According to Mühlhoff this happens for example through a trend of ‘sealed surfaces’ in interface design that shields away the inner workings of digital devices even from those users who want to know more.

=== AI Use in Education ===
Mühlhoffs critical view on certain uses of AI is also apparent in his evaluation of assessment software based on large language models like ChatGPT. An investigation conducted by Muhlhoff and Henningsen on the "AI-Correction aid" offered by the german company Fobizz revealed immense methodological as well as technological shortcomings of these systems. The study shows that automated feedback offered by this tool is often inconsistent and implausible. Additionally, the study claims that the evaluation of submissions produces random grading that does not seem to conform to any clearly distinguishable evaluation benchmark. Mühlhoff evaluates as especially alarming can not reliably recognize submissions that are either deliberate nonsenese or completely AI generated. In several cases, these submissions were rated as equally good or even better than serious and human made submissions. The study states that these problems are partially not simply a result of the concrete implementation of the software, but rather result from the inherent properties of large language models, which operate in the background of many such tools. The study concludes that the error-prone automated grading of such a tool might imply "grave consequences" for students.

=== Digital Fascism ===
Mühlhoff claims that political movements of Right-wing populism and Alt-right, like Trumpism, constitute a current form of fascist politics. According to Mühlhoff, anti-Rule of law aspirations are marked by an increasing use of digital technologies, Artificial Intelligence- and Data analysis centered technologies most central among them.

Regarding the First presidency of Donald Trump, Mühlhoff argued that he, in contrast to proponents of other conservative positions, does not position himself agonistically inside the political system, following its rules, but posits himself antagonistically and in conflict with this political system. Mühlhoff claims this antagonistic position, which he refers to as „Principle of the middle finger“ is central to Trump’s self depiction as authentic, this authenticity in turn making him an attractive candidate for his supporters. For this reason, he argues against critiques of Trump voters as irrational and against a diffamation of Trump. Instead, he argues that the double humiliation of both candidate and voters in diffamatory rhetorics leads to an increased identification of the voters with Trump. He calls this phenomenon „fatal identification“. He claims that, for this reason, a critique of Trump is needed which underscores and investigates the emotional aspects at play as well as the role of Trump’s self-depiction. For Mühlhoff, Trump is not successful despite, but precisely because of his strongly emotionalized self-presentation and his refusal of the current political apparatus of the United States.

After the second election of Donald Trump and his cooperation with Elon Musk, especially with the Department of Government Efficiency Mühlhoff criticized the digital invasion and takeover of administrative infrastructure by Musk as a fascist seizure of control. According to Mühlhoff, these attacks on the American administrative infrastructure show a „personal willingness to use violence“, ambitions to „destroy the [Rule of Law]“ as well as a „clever use of newest technology as an instrument of power“, that, in sum, characterize the current movement as fascist. Mühlhoff argues that fascism is not defined through its political contents, but by a destructive takeover of the political apparatus. While the use of new technology is classically not considered to be a definitory marker of fascist movements, Mühlhoff argues that this aspect was already present in historical forms of fascism, supporting his claim in reference to Edwin Black's book IBM and the Holocaust. Mühlhoff interprets Trump’s and Musk’s actions as a tripartite strategy to take over power, its first step being an infiltration of the administration and the placement of collaborators in strategic positions. This step is followed by the linkage and analysis of the data acquired in the first step, before they then get used in previously not possible ways in the third step. With an eye to the future development of these undertakings, Mühlhoff expresses concern that AI-based predictive analytics might be used to categorize and sort marginalized people with regard to predicted characteristics and patterns of behavior, resulting in an unequal treatment that might range from Social Scoring to targeted killings. This new form of fascism is facilitated through a „composition of political regime and tech-industry“.

== Awards ==
- 2026: Book Prize “The Political Book” (Das politische Buch) from Friedrich Ebert Foundation for Artificial Intelligence and the New Fascism (Künstliche Intelligenz und der neue Faschismus. Philipp Reclam jun. Verlag, Ditzingen 2025, ISBN 978-3-15-014666-8).
- 2022: “Hans-Mühlenhoff-Preis” for excellent teaching of the University of Osnabrück

== Publications ==
=== Books ===
- The Ethics of AI: Power, Critique, Responsibility. Bristol University Press, Bristol 2025, doi:10.51952/9781529249262.
- Künstliche Intelligenz und der neue Faschismus. Philipp Reclam jun. Verlag, Ditzingen 2025, ISBN 978-3-15-014666-8.
- Die Macht der Daten. Warum Künstliche Intelligenz eine Frage der Ethik ist. V&R unipress, Universitätsverlag Osnabrück, 2023, doi:10.14220/9783737015523.
- Mühlhoff, Rainer, Anja Breljak, und Jan Slaby, Hrsg. Affekt Macht Netz. Auf dem Weg zu einer Sozialtheorie der digitalen Gesellschaft. Bielefeld: transcript, 2019, ISBN 978-3-8376-4439-5.
- Immersive Macht. Affekttheorie nach Foucault und Spinoza. Frankfurt am Main: Campus, 2018, ISBN 978-3-593-50834-4.

=== Articles (Selection) ===
- The New Fascism Is Here - And Big Tech Is Running It. Verfassungsblog, translated by Rainer Mühlhoff, 2025. https://rainermuehlhoff.de/en/The-New-Fashism/ (Originally published as Trump und der neue Faschismus: Warum der Griff nach dem Verwaltungsapparat so gefährlich ist, February 9, 2025 at https://verfassungsblog.de/trump-und-der-neue-faschismus/. doi:10.59704/854f51e58c05b98e.)
- Predictive Privacy: Collective Data Protection in the Context of AI and Big Data. In: Big Data & Society, 2023, doi:10.1177/20539517231166886, S. 1–14.
- Mühlhoff, Rainer, und Theresa Willem. Social Media Advertising for Clinical Studies: Ethical and Data Protection Implications of Online Targeting. In: Big Data & Society, 2023, doi:10.1177/20539517231156127, S. 1–15.
- Mühlhoff, Rainer, und Hannah Ruschemeier. Predictive Analytics und DSGVO: Ethische und rechtliche Implikationen. In: Telemedicus – Recht der Informationsgesellschaft, Tagungsband zur Sommerkonferenz, 2022, S. 38–67.
- Prädiktive Privatheit: Kollektiver Datenschutz im Kontext von Big Data und KI. In: Künstliche Intelligenz, Demokratie und Privatheit, 2022, doi:10.5771/9783748913344-31, S. 31–58.
- Predictive Privacy: Towards an Applied Ethics of Data Analytics. In: Ethics and Information Technology. 23 (2021), doi:10.1007/s10676-021-09606-x, S. 675–690.
- Automatisierte Ungleichheit: Ethik der Künstlichen Intelligenz in der biopolitische Wende des Digitalen Kapitalismus. In: Deutsche Zeitschrift für Philosophie. 68 (2020), doi:10.1515/dzph-2020-0059, S. 867–890.
- Human-Aided Artificial Intelligence: Or, How to Run Large Computations in Human Brains? In: New Media & Society. 22 (2020), S. 1868–84. doi:10.1177/1461444819885334.
- Menschengestützte Künstliche Intelligenz. Über die soziotechnischen Voraussetzungen von Deep Learning. In: ZfM – Zeitschrift für Medienwissenschaft 21(2) (2019), S. 56–64. doi:10.25969/mediarep/12633.
- Digitale Entmündigung und ‚User Experience Design‘. In: Leviathan – Berliner Zeitschrift für Sozialwissenschaft. 46 (2018), doi:10.5771/0340-0425-2018-4-551, S. 551–74.
