= Generative model =

Model for generating observable data in probability and statistics

Generative models are a class of computational models frequently used for classification. In machine learning, it typically models the joint distribution of inputs and outputs, such as P(X,Y), or it models how inputs are distributed within each class, such as P(X∣Y) together with a class prior P(Y). Because it describes a full data-generating process, a generative model can be used to draw new samples that resemble the observed data, a process often referred to as synthetic data generation. Generative models are used for density estimation, simulation, and learning with missing or partially labeled data. In classification, they can predict labels by combining P(X∣Y) and P(Y) and applying Bayes' rule. Generative models are often contrasted with discriminative models, which focus on predicting outputs from inputs directly.

Generative model approaches which use a joint probability distribution instead, include naive Bayes classifiers, Gaussian mixture models, variational autoencoders, generative adversarial networks and others.

== Definition ==
In statistical classification, two main approaches are called the generative approach and the discriminative approach. These compute classifiers by different approaches, differing in the degree of statistical modelling. Terminology is inconsistent, (Note: Three leading sources, Ng & Jordan 2002, Jebara 2004, and Mitchell 2015, give different divisions and definitions.) but three major types can be distinguished:

1. A generative model is a statistical model of the joint probability distribution $P(X, Y)$ on a given observable variable X and target variable Y; A generative model can be used to "generate" random instances (outcomes) of an observation x.
2. A discriminative model is a model of the conditional probability $P(Y\mid X = x)$ of the target Y, given an observation x. It can be used to "discriminate" the value of the target variable Y, given an observation x.
3. Classifiers computed without using a probability model are also referred to loosely as "discriminative".

The distinction between these last two classes is not consistently made; Jebara (2004) refers to these three classes as generative learning, conditional learning, and discriminative learning, but Ng & Jordan (2002) only distinguish two classes, calling them generative classifiers (joint distribution) and discriminative classifiers (conditional distribution or no distribution), not distinguishing between the latter two classes. Analogously, a classifier based on a generative model is a generative classifier, while a classifier based on a discriminative model is a discriminative classifier, though this term also refers to classifiers that are not based on a model.

In application to classification, one wishes to go from an observation x to a label y (or probability distribution on labels). One can compute this directly, without using a probability distribution (distribution-free classifier); one can estimate the probability of a label given an observation, $P(Y|X=x)$ (discriminative model), and base classification on that; or one can estimate the joint distribution $P(X, Y)$ (generative model), from that compute the conditional probability $P(Y|X=x)$, and then base classification on that. These are increasingly indirect, but increasingly probabilistic, allowing more domain knowledge and probability theory to be applied. In practice different approaches are used, depending on the particular problem, and hybrids can combine strengths of multiple approaches.

An alternative division defines these symmetrically as:

- a generative model is a model of the conditional probability of the observable X, given a target y, symbolically, $P(X\mid Y = y)$
- a discriminative model is a model of the conditional probability of the target Y, given an observation x, symbolically, $P(Y\mid X = x)$

Regardless of precise definition, the terminology is constitutional because a generative model can be used to "generate" random instances (outcomes), either of an observation and target $(x, y)$, or of an observation x given a target value y, while a discriminative model or discriminative classifier (without a model) can be used to "discriminate" the value of the target variable Y, given an observation x. The difference between "discriminate" (distinguish) and "classify" is subtle, and these are not consistently distinguished. (The term "discriminative classifier" becomes a pleonasm when "discrimination" is equivalent to "classification".)

The term "generative model" is also used to describe models that generate instances of output variables in a way that has no clear relationship to probability distributions over potential samples of input variables. Generative adversarial networks are examples of this class of generative models, and are judged primarily by the similarity of particular outputs to potential inputs. Such models are not classifiers.

=== Relationships between models ===
In application to classification, the observable X is frequently a continuous variable, the target Y is generally a discrete variable consisting of a finite set of labels, and the conditional probability $P(Y\mid X)$ can also be interpreted as a (non-deterministic) target function $f\colon X \to Y$, considering X as inputs and Y as outputs.

Given a finite set of labels, the two definitions of "generative model" are closely related. A model of the conditional distribution $P(X\mid Y = y)$ is a model of the distribution of each label, and a model of the joint distribution is equivalent to a model of the distribution of label values $P(Y)$, together with the distribution of observations given a label, $P(X\mid Y)$; symbolically, $P(X, Y) = P(X\mid Y)P(Y).$ Thus, while a model of the joint probability distribution is more informative than a model of the distribution of label (but without their relative frequencies), it is a relatively small step, hence these are not always distinguished.

Given a model of the joint distribution, $P(X, Y)$, the distribution of the individual variables can be computed as the marginal distributions $P(X) = \sum_y P(X , Y = y)$ and $P(Y) = \int_x P(Y, X = x)$ (considering X as continuous, hence integrating over it, and Y as discrete, hence summing over it), and either conditional distribution can be computed from the definition of conditional probability: $P(X\mid Y)=P(X, Y)/P(Y)$ and $P(Y\mid X)=P(X, Y)/P(X)$.

Given a model of one conditional probability, and estimated probability distributions for the variables X and Y, denoted $P(X)$ and $P(Y)$, one can estimate the opposite conditional probability using Bayes' rule:

$$P(X\mid Y)P(Y) = P(Y\mid X)P(X).$$

For example, given a generative model for $P(X\mid Y)$, one can estimate:

$$P(Y\mid X) = P(X\mid Y)P(Y)/P(X),$$

and given a discriminative model for $P(Y\mid X)$, one can estimate:

$$P(X\mid Y) = P(Y\mid X)P(X)/P(Y).$$

Note that Bayes' rule (computing one conditional probability in terms of the other) and the definition of conditional probability (computing conditional probability in terms of the joint distribution) are frequently conflated as well.

=== Contrast with discriminative classifiers ===
A generative algorithm models how the data was generated in order to categorize a signal. It asks the question: based on my generation assumptions, which category is most likely to generate this signal? A discriminative algorithm does not care about how the data was generated, it simply categorizes a given signal. So, discriminative algorithms try to learn $p(y|x)$ directly from the data and then try to classify data. On the other hand, generative algorithms try to learn $p(x,y)$ which can be transformed into $p(y|x)$ later to classify the data. One of the advantages of generative algorithms is that you can use $p(x,y)$ to generate new data similar to existing data. On the other hand, it has been proved that some discriminative algorithms give better performance than some generative algorithms in classification tasks.

Despite the fact that discriminative models do not need to model the distribution of the observed variables, they cannot generally express complex relationships between the observed and target variables. But in general, they don't necessarily perform better than generative models at classification and regression tasks. The two classes are seen as complementary or as different views of the same procedure.

== Applications ==
- Sampling / simulation
- Classification
- Density estimation and likelihood
- Missing data and imputation
- Anomaly detection
- Semi-supervised learning

=== Examples ===
==== Simple example ====
Suppose the input data is $x \in \{1, 2\}$, the set of labels for $x$ is $y \in \{0, 1\}$, and there are the following 4 data points: $(x,y) = \{(1,0), (1,1), (2,0), (2,1)\}$

For the above data, estimating the joint probability distribution $p(x,y)$ from the empirical measure will be the following:

	$y=0$	$y=1$
$x=1$	$1/4$	$1/4$
$x=2$	$1/4$	$1/4$

while $p(y|x)$ will be following:

	$y=0$	$y=1$
$x=1$	$1/2$	$1/2$
$x=2$	$1/2$	$1/2$

==== Text generation ====
Shannon (1948) gives an example in which a table of frequencies of English word pairs is used to generate a sentence beginning with "representing and speedily is an good"; which is not proper English but which will increasingly approximate it as the table is moved from word pairs to word triplets etc.

== Families and types ==
=== Generative models ===
Types of generative models are:

- Gaussian mixture model (and other types of mixture model)
- Hidden Markov model
- Probabilistic context-free grammar
- Bayesian network (e.g. Naive bayes, Autoregressive model)
- Generative adversarial network
- Generative AI
- Averaged one-dependence estimators
- Latent Dirichlet allocation
- Boltzmann machine (e.g. Restricted Boltzmann machine, Deep belief network)
- Variational autoencoder
- Flow-based generative model
- Energy based model
- Diffusion model
- Linear discriminant analysis

If the observed data are truly sampled from the generative model, then fitting the parameters of the generative model to maximize the data likelihood is a common method. However, since most statistical models are only approximations to the true distribution, if the model's application is to infer about a subset of variables conditional on known values of others, then it can be argued that the approximation makes more assumptions than are necessary to solve the problem at hand. In such cases, it can be more accurate to model the conditional density functions directly using a discriminative model (see below), although application-specific details will ultimately dictate which approach is most suitable in any particular case.

=== Deep generative models ===
With the rise of deep learning, a new family of methods, called deep generative models (DGMs), is formed through the combination of generative models and deep neural networks. An increase in the scale of the neural networks is typically accompanied by an increase in the scale of the training data, both of which are required for good performance.

Popular DGMs include variational autoencoders (VAEs), generative adversarial networks (GANs), and auto-regressive models. Recently, there has been a trend to build very large deep generative models. For example, GPT-3, and its precursor GPT-2, are auto-regressive neural language models that contain billions of parameters, BigGAN and VQ-VAE which are used for image generation that can have hundreds of millions of parameters, and Jukebox is a very large generative model for musical audio that contains billions of parameters.

== See also ==
- Discriminative model
- Graphical model

== Sources ==
- Shannon, C. E. (1948). "A Mathematical Theory of Communication" (PDF). Bell System Technical Journal. 27 (July, October): 379–423, 623–656. Bibcode:1948BSTJ...27..379S. doi:10.1002/j.1538-7305.1948.tb01338.x. hdl:10338.dmlcz/101429. Archived from the original (PDF) on 2016-06-06.
- Mitchell, Tom M. (2015). "3. Generative and Discriminative Classifiers: Naive Bayes and Logistic Regression" (PDF). Machine Learning.
- Ng, Andrew Y.; Jordan, Michael I. (2002). "On discriminative vs. generative classifiers: A comparison of logistic regression and naive bayes" (PDF). Advances in Neural Information Processing Systems.
