= Layer (deep learning) =

Deep learning model structure

Comparison of the LeNet and AlexNet convolution, pooling, and dense layers (AlexNet image size should be 227×227×3, instead of 224×224×3, so the math will come out right. The original paper said different numbers, but Andrej Karpathy, the former head of computer vision at Tesla, said it should be 227×227×3 (he said Alex didn't describe why he put 224×224×3). The next convolution should be 11×11 with stride 4: 55×55×96 (instead of 54×54×96). It would be calculated, for example, as: [(input width 227 - kernel width 11) / stride 4] + 1 = [(227 - 11) / 4] + 1 = 55. Since the kernel output is the same length as width, its area is 55×55.)

A layer in a deep learning model is a stage that take the previous stage process it and pass to the next stage or network topology in the model's architecture, which takes information from the previous layers and then passes it to the next layer. In simple world layer means stage.

== Layer types ==
The first type of layer is the Dense layer, also called the fully-connected layer, and is used for abstract representations of input data. In this layer, neurons connect to every neuron in the preceding layer. In multilayer perceptron networks, these layers are stacked together.

The Convolutional layer is typically used for image analysis tasks. In this layer, the network detects edges, textures, and patterns. The outputs from this layer are then fed into a fully-connected layer for further processing. See also: CNN model.

The Pooling layer is used to reduce the size of data input.

The Recurrent layer is used for text processing with a memory function. Similar to the Convolutional layer, the output of recurrent layers are usually fed into a fully-connected layer for further processing. See also: RNN model.

The Normalization layer adjusts the output data from previous layers to achieve a regular distribution. This results in improved scalability and model training.

A Hidden layer is any of the layers in a Neural Network that aren't the input or output layers.

== Differences with layers of the neocortex ==
There is an intrinsic difference between deep learning layering and neocortical layering: deep learning layering depends on network topology, while neocortical layering depends on intra-layers homogeneity.

== See also ==
- Deep Learning
- Neocortex § Layers
