= Resampling =

Resampling may refer to:

- Resampling (audio), several related audio processes
- Resampling (statistics), resampling methods in statistics
- Resampling (bitmap), scaling of bitmap images

== See also ==
- Sample-rate conversion
- Downsampling
- Upsampling
- Oversampling
- Sampling (signal processing)
- Signal (information theory)
- Data conversion
- Interpolation
- Multivariate interpolation
- Subsampling (disambiguation)
