= Alex Krizhevsky =

Canadian computer scientist

Alex Krizhevsky is a Soviet-born Canadian computer scientist most noted for his work on artificial neural networks and deep learning. In 2012, Krizhevsky, Ilya Sutskever and their PhD advisor Geoffrey Hinton, at the University of Toronto, developed a powerful visual-recognition network AlexNet using only two GeForce-branded GPU cards. This revolutionized research in neural networks. Previously neural networks were trained on CPUs. The transition to GPUs opened the way to the development of advanced AI models.

== AlexNet ==
Motivated by Sutskever and inspired by Hinton, Krizhevsky developed AlexNet to expand the limits in image recognition and classification. Building on Convolutional Neural Networks and Sutskever's Deep Neural Network approach of deepening the neural layers far beyond the convention of the time—as well as adding Dropout for training resilience—AlexNet won the ImageNet challenge in 2012. The team presented their paper for AlexNet at NeurIPS (NIPS) 2012.

Shortly after AlexNet's debut, Krizhevsky and Sutskever sold their startup, DNN Research Inc., to Google. Krizhevsky left Google in September 2017 after losing interest in the work, to work at the company Dessa in support of new deep-learning techniques. Many of his numerous papers on machine learning and computer vision are frequently cited by other researchers. He is also the main author of the CIFAR-10 and CIFAR-100 datasets.

== Legacy ==
AlexNet is widely credited with igniting the deep learning revolution. Its success demonstrated the effectiveness of deep neural networks trained on GPUs, leading to rapid progress across multiple domains of artificial intelligence beyond computer vision. The techniques and momentum generated by AlexNet helped shape the development of modern natural language processing models, including large-scale transformer-based models such as BERT and GPT, which power tools like ChatGPT.
