= Process network synthesis =

Process network synthesis (PNS) is a method to represent a process structure in a 'directed bipartite graph'. Process network synthesis uses the P-graph method to create a process structure. The scientific aim of this method is to find optimum structures.

Process network synthesis uses a bipartite graph method P-graph and employs combinatorial rules to find all feasible network solutions (maximum structure) and links raw materials to desired products related to the given problem. With a branch and bound optimisation routine and by defining the target value an optimum structure can be generated that optimises a chosen target function.

Process Network Synthesis was originally developed to solve chemical process engineering processes. Target value as well as the structure can be changed depending on the field of application. Thus many more fields of application followed.

== Applications ==
At Pannon University software the tools PNS Editor and PNS Studio were programmed to generate maximum structure of processes. This software includes the p-graph method and MSG, SSG and ABB branch and bound algorithms to detect optimum structures within the maximum available process flows.

PNS is used in different applications where it can be used to find optimum process structures like:

- Process engineering: Chemical process designs and the Synthesis of chemical processes is applied in different case studies.
- Optimum energy technology networks for regional and urban energy systems: In case of regional and urban energy planning the financially most feasible solution for resource systems is selected as target value. With this setting material- and energy flows, energy demand and cost of technologies are considered and the optimum technology network can be found. Simultaneously the robustness of technologies due to price changes and limitations in resource availability can be identified.
- Evacuation routes in buildings: The aim is to find optimal routes to evacuate buildings depending on specific side parameters.
- Transportation routes: In this research area transportation routes with minimum cost and lowest environmental impact can be identified.
