= Subsampling =

Subsampling or sub-sampling may refer to:

- Resampling (alternative to bootstrap)
- Sampling (statistics)
- Replication (statistics)
- Downsampling in signal processing
- Chroma subsampling
- Sub-sampling (chemistry)
