= Pooling layer =

Architectural motif in neural networks for aggregating information

In neural networks, a pooling layer is a kind of network layer that downsamples and aggregates information that is dispersed among many vectors into fewer vectors. It has several uses. It removes redundant information, thus reducing the amount of computation and memory required, which makes the model more robust to small variations in the input; and it increases the receptive field of neurons in later layers in the network.

== Convolutional neural network pooling ==
Pooling is most commonly used in convolutional neural networks (CNN). Below is a description of pooling in 2-dimensional CNNs. The generalization to n-dimensions is immediate.

As notation, we consider a tensor $x \in \R^{H \times W \times C}$, where $H$ is height, $W$ is width, and $C$ is the number of channels. A pooling layer outputs a tensor $y \in \R^{H' \times W' \times C'}$.

We define two variables $f, s$ called "filter size" (aka "kernel size") and "stride". Sometimes, it is necessary to use a different filter size and stride for horizontal and vertical directions. In such cases, we define 4 variables:$f_H, f_W, s_H, s_W$.

The receptive field of an entry in the output tensor, $y$, are all the entries in $x$ that can affect that entry.

=== Max pooling ===
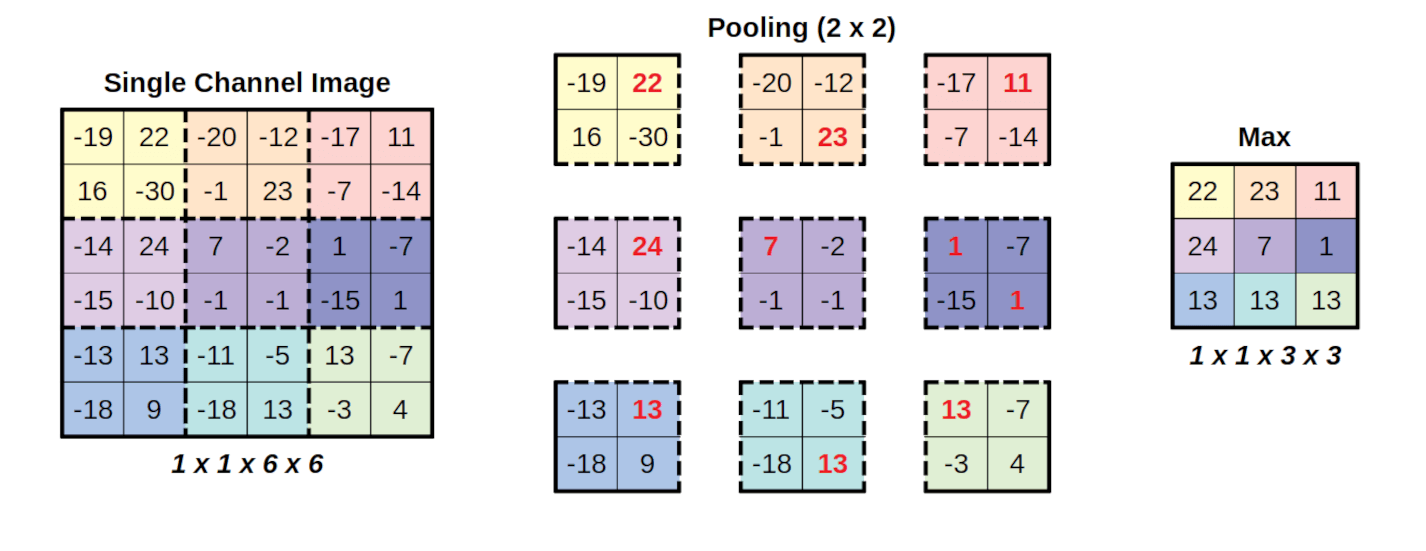
Worked example of max pooling, with filter size $f = 2$ and stride $s = 2$

Max Pooling (MaxPool) is commonly used in CNNs to reduce the spatial dimensions of feature maps.

Define
$$\mathrm{MaxPool}(x | f, s)_{0, 0, 0} = \max(x_{0:f-1, 0:f-1, 0})$$
where $0:f-1$ means the range $0, 1, \dots, f-1$. Note that we need to avoid the off-by-one error. The next input is
$$\mathrm{MaxPool}(x | f, s)_{1, 0, 0} = \max(x_{s:s + f-1, 0:f-1, 0})$$
and so on. The receptive field of $y_{i, j, c}$ is $x_{is + f-1, js + f-1, c}$, so in general,
$$\mathrm{MaxPool}(x | f, s)_{i,j,c} = \mathrm{max}(x_{is: is+f-1, js: js + f-1, c})$$
If the horizontal and vertical filter size and strides differ, then in general,
$$\mathrm{MaxPool}(x | f, s)_{i,j,c} = \mathrm{max}(x_{is_H: is_H+f_H-1, js_W: js_W + f_W-1, c})$$
More succinctly, we can write $y_k = \max(\{x_{k'} | k' \text{ in the receptive field of }k\})$.

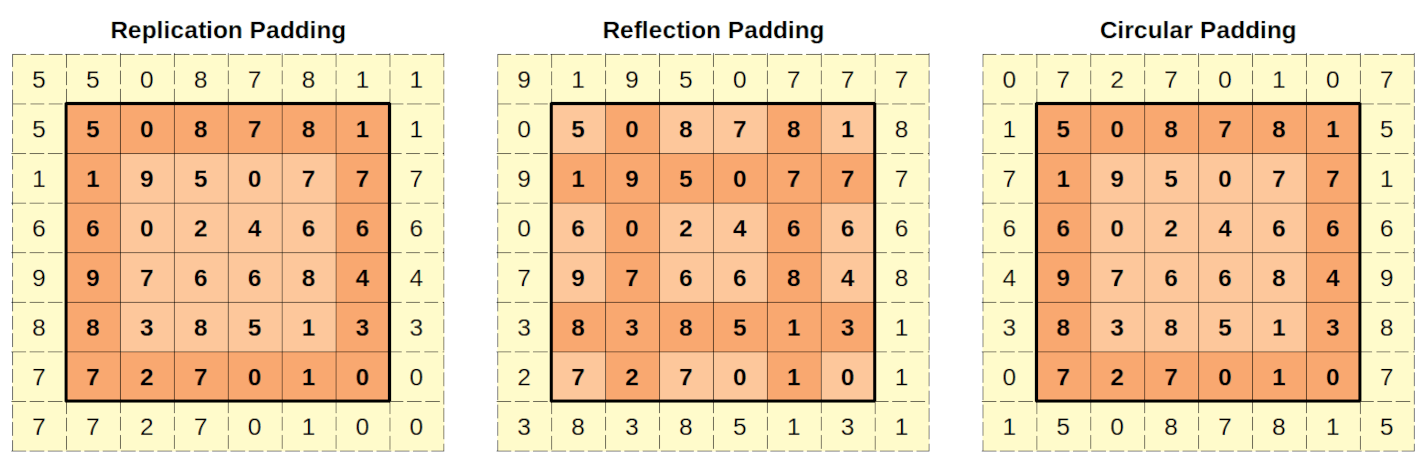
Three example padding conditions. Replication condition means that the pixel outside is padded with the closest pixel inside. The reflection padding is where the pixel outside is padded with the pixel inside, reflected across the boundary of the image. The circular padding is where the pixel outside wraps around to the other side of the image.

If $H$ is not expressible as $ks + f$ where $k$ is an integer, then for computing the entries of the output tensor on the boundaries, max pooling would attempt to take as inputs variables off the tensor. In this case, how those non-existent variables are handled depends on the padding conditions, illustrated on the right.

Global Max Pooling (GMP) is a specific kind of max pooling where the output tensor has shape $\R^{C}$ and the receptive field of $y_c$ is all of $x_{0:H, 0:W, c}$. That is, it takes the maximum over each entire channel. It is often used just before the final fully connected layers in a CNN classification head.

=== Average pooling ===
Average pooling (AvgPool) is similarly defined
$$\mathrm{AvgPool}(x | f, s)_{i,j,c} = \mathrm{average}(x_{is: is+f-1, js: js + f-1, c}) =
\frac{1}{f^2} \sum_{k \in is: is+f-1}\sum_{l \in js: js + f-1} x_{k, l, c}$$
Global Average Pooling (GAP) is defined similarly to GMP. It was first proposed in Network-in-Network. Similarly to GMP, it is often used just before the final fully connected layers in a CNN classification head.

=== Interpolations ===
There are some interpolations of max pooling and average pooling.

Mixed Pooling is a linear sum of max pooling and average pooling. That is,
$$\mathrm{MixedPool}(x | f, s, w) = w \mathrm{MaxPool}(x | f, s) + (1-w)\mathrm{AvgPool}(x | f, s)$$
where $w \in [0, 1]$ is either a hyperparameter, a learnable parameter, or randomly sampled anew every time.

Lp Pooling is similar to average pooling, but uses Lp norm average instead of average:
$$y_k = \left(\frac 1N \sum_{k' \text{ in the receptive field of } k} |x_{k'}|^p\right)^{1/p}$$
where $N$ is the size of receptive field, and $p \geq 1$ is a hyperparameter. If all activations are non-negative, then average pooling is the case of $p = 1$, and max pooling is the case of $p \to \infty$. Square-root pooling is the case of $p = 2$.

Stochastic pooling samples a random activation $x_{k'}$ from the receptive field with probability $\frac{x_{k'}}{\sum_{k''} x_{k''}}$. It is the same as average pooling in expectation.

Softmax pooling is like max pooling, but uses softmax, i.e. $\frac{\sum_{k'} e^{\beta x_{k'}}x_{k'}}{\sum_{k''} e^{\beta x_{k''}}}$ where $\beta > 0$. Average pooling is the case of $\beta \downarrow 0$, and max pooling is the case of $\beta \uparrow \infty$

Local Importance-based Pooling generalizes softmax pooling by $\frac{\sum_{k'} e^{ g(x_{k'})}x_{k'}}{\sum_{k''} e^{ g(x_{k''})}}$ where $g$ is a learnable function.

RoI pooling to size 2x2. In this example, the RoI proposal has size 7x5. It is divided into 4 rectangles. Because 7 is not divisible by 2, it is divided to the nearest integers, as 7 = 3 + 4. Similarly, 5 is divided to 2 + 3. This gives 4 sub-rectangles. The maximum of each sub-rectangle is taken. This is the output of the RoI pooling.

=== Other poolings ===
Spatial pyramidal pooling applies max pooling (or any other form of pooling) in a pyramid structure. That is, it applies global max pooling, then applies max pooling to the image divided into 4 equal parts, then 16, etc. The results are then concatenated. It is a hierarchical form of global pooling, and similar to global pooling, it is often used just before a classification head.

Region of Interest Pooling (also known as RoI pooling) is a variant of max pooling used in R-CNNs for object detection. It is designed to take an arbitrarily-sized input matrix, and output a fixed-sized output matrix.

Covariance pooling computes the covariance matrix of the vectors
$$\{x_{k, l, 0:C-1}\}_{k \in is:is + f-1, l \in js:js + f-1}$$
which is then flattened to a $C^2$-dimensional vector $y_{i,j, 0:C^2-1}$. Global covariance pooling is used similarly to global max pooling. As average pooling computes the average, which is a first-degree statistic, and covariance is a second-degree statistic, covariance pooling is also called "second-order pooling". It can be generalized to higher-order poolings.

Blur Pooling means applying a blurring method before downsampling. For example, the Rect-2 blur pooling means taking an average pooling at $f = 2, s = 1$, then taking every second pixel (identity with $s = 2$).

== Vision Transformer pooling ==
In Vision Transformers (ViT), there are the following common kinds of poolings.

BERT-like pooling uses a dummy [CLS] token, "classification". For classification, the output at [CLS] is the classification token, which is then processed by a LayerNorm-feedforward-softmax module into a probability distribution, which is the network's prediction of class probability distribution. This is the one used by the original ViT and Masked Autoencoder.

Global average pooling (GAP) does not use the dummy token, but simply takes the average of all output tokens as the classification token. It was mentioned in the original ViT as being equally good.

Multihead attention pooling (MAP) applies a multi headed attention block to pooling. Specifically, it takes as input a list of vectors $x_1, x_2, \dots, x_n$, which might be thought of as the output vectors of a layer of a ViT. It then applies a feedforward layer $\mathrm{FFN}$ on each vector, resulting in a matrix $V = [\mathrm{FFN}(v_1), \dots, \mathrm{FFN}(v_n)]$. This is then sent to a multi-headed attention, resulting in $\mathrm{MultiheadedAttention}(Q, V, V)$, where $Q$ is a matrix of trainable parameters. This was first proposed in the Set Transformer architecture.

Later papers demonstrated that GAP and MAP both perform better than BERT-like pooling.

== Graph neural network pooling ==
In graph neural networks (GNN), there are also two forms of pooling: global and local. Global pooling can be reduced to a local pooling where the receptive field is the entire output.

1. Local pooling: a local pooling layer coarsens the graph via downsampling. Local pooling is used to increase the receptive field of a GNN, in a similar fashion to pooling layers in convolutional neural networks. Examples k-nearest neighbours pooling, top-k pooling, and self-attention pooling.
2. Global pooling: a global pooling layer, also known as readout layer, provides fixed-size representation of the whole graph. The global pooling layer must be permutation invariant, such that permutations in the ordering of graph nodes and edges do not alter the final output. Examples include element-wise sum, mean or maximum.

Local pooling layers coarsen the graph via downsampling. We present here several learnable local pooling strategies that have been proposed. For each case, the input in the initial graph is represented by a matrix $\mathbf{X}$ of node features and the graph adjacency matrix $\mathbf{A}$. The output is the new matrix $\mathbf{X}'$of node features and the new graph adjacency matrix $\mathbf{A}'$.

=== Top-k pooling ===
We first set

$\mathbf{y} = \frac{\mathbf{X}\mathbf{p}}{\Vert\mathbf{p}\Vert}$

where $\mathbf{p}$ is a learnable projection vector. The projection vector $\mathbf{p}$ computes a scalar projection value for each graph node.

The top-k pooling layer can then be formalised as follows:

$$\mathbf{X}' = (\mathbf{X} \odot \text{sigmoid}(\mathbf{y}))_{\mathbf{i}}$$

$$\mathbf{A}' = \mathbf{A}_{\mathbf{i}, \mathbf{i}}$$

where $\mathbf{i} = \text{top}_k(\mathbf{y})$ is the subset of nodes with the top-k highest projection scores, $\odot$ denotes element-wise matrix multiplication, and $\text{sigmoid}(\cdot)$ is the sigmoid function. In other words, the nodes with the top-k highest projection scores are retained in the new adjacency matrix $\mathbf{A}'$. The $\text{sigmoid}(\cdot)$ operation makes the projection vector $\mathbf{p}$ trainable by backpropagation, which otherwise would produce discrete outputs.

=== Self-attention pooling ===
We first set

$$\mathbf{y} = \text{GNN}(\mathbf{X}, \mathbf{A})$$

where $\text{GNN}$ is a generic permutation equivariant GNN layer (e.g., GCN, GAT, MPNN).

The Self-attention pooling layer can then be formalised as follows:

$$\mathbf{X}' = (\mathbf{X} \odot \mathbf{y})_{\mathbf{i}}$$

$$\mathbf{A}' = \mathbf{A}_{\mathbf{i}, \mathbf{i}}$$

where $\mathbf{i} = \text{top}_k(\mathbf{y})$ is the subset of nodes with the top-k highest projection scores, $\odot$ denotes element-wise matrix multiplication.

The self-attention pooling layer can be seen as an extension of the top-k pooling layer. Differently from top-k pooling, the self-attention scores computed in self-attention pooling account both for the graph features and the graph topology.

== History ==
In early 20th century, neuroanatomists noticed a certain motif where multiple neurons synapse to the same neuron. This was given a functional explanation as "local pooling", which makes vision translation-invariant. Hartline gave supporting evidence for the theory by electrophysiological experiments on the receptive fields of retinal ganglion cells. The Hubel and Wiesel experiments showed that the vision system in cats is similar to a convolutional neural network, with some cells summing over inputs from the lower layer. See Westheimer for citations to these early literature.

During the 1970s, in order to explain the effects of depth perception, some authors, such as Julesz & Chang, proposed that the vision system implements a disparity-selective mechanism by global pooling, where the outputs from matching pairs of retinal regions in the two eyes are pooled in higher order cells. See Schumer & Ganz for citations to these early literature. In artificial neural networks, max pooling was used in 1990 for speech processing (1-dimensional convolution).

== See also ==
- Convolutional neural network
- Subsampling
- Image scaling
- Feature extraction
- Region of interest
- Graph neural network
