= Gelernter =

Gelernter is a surname. Notable people with the surname include:

- David Gelernter (born 1955), American artist, writer and academic
- Herbert Gelernter (1929–2015), American computer scientist
- Joel Gelernter, American psychiatrist
- Mark Gelernter, American academic, historian, and writer
