= Dartmouth workshop =

1956 scientific conference on artificial intelligence

Dartmouth Summer Research Project on Artificial Intelligence
- Date: 1956
- Duration: Eight weeks
- Venue: Dartmouth College, Hanover, New Hampshire, United States
- Organised by: John McCarthy, Marvin Minsky, Nathaniel Rochester, and Claude Shannon
- Participants: John McCarthy, Marvin Minsky, Nathaniel Rochester, Claude Shannon, and others

The Dartmouth Summer Research Project on Artificial Intelligence was a 1956 summer workshop widely considered to be the founding event of artificial intelligence as a field. The workshop has been referred to as "the Constitutional Convention of AI". The project's four organizers, Claude Shannon, John McCarthy, Nathaniel Rochester and Marvin Minsky, are considered some of the "founding fathers" of AI. However it was not the first conference devoted to what would now be described as the question of artificial intelligence: it postdated meetings such as the 1951 Paris cybernetics conference and the Macy meetings.

The project lasted approximately six to eight weeks and consisted largely of brainstorming sessions. Eleven mathematicians and scientists originally planned to attend; not all of them attended, but more than ten others came for short times.

== Background ==
In the early 1950s, there were various names for the field of "thinking machines": cybernetics, automata theory, and complex information processing. The variety of names suggests the variety of conceptual orientations.

In 1955, John McCarthy, then a young Assistant Professor of Mathematics at Dartmouth College, decided to organize a group to clarify and develop ideas about thinking machines. He picked the name 'Artificial Intelligence' for the new field. He chose the name partly for its neutrality; avoiding a focus on narrow automata theory, and avoiding cybernetics which was heavily focused on analog feedback, as well as him potentially having to accept the assertive Norbert Wiener as guru or having to argue with him.

In early 1955, McCarthy approached the Rockefeller Foundation to request funding for a summer seminar at Dartmouth for about 10 participants. In June, he and Claude Shannon, a founder of information theory then at Bell Labs, met with Robert Morison, Director of Biological and Medical Research to discuss the idea and possible funding, though Morison was unsure whether money would be made available for such a visionary project.

On September 2, 1955, the project was formally proposed by McCarthy, Marvin Minsky, Nathaniel Rochester and Claude Shannon. The proposal is credited with introducing the term 'artificial intelligence'.

The Proposal states:

We propose that a 2-month, 10-man study of artificial intelligence be carried out during the summer of 1956 at Dartmouth College in Hanover, New Hampshire. The study is to proceed on the basis of the conjecture that every aspect of learning or any other feature of intelligence can in principle be so precisely described that a machine can be made to simulate it. An attempt will be made to find how to make machines use language, form abstractions and concepts, solve kinds of problems now reserved for humans, and improve themselves. We think that a significant advance can be made in one or more of these problems if a carefully selected group of scientists work on it together for a summer.

The proposal goes on to discuss computers, natural language processing, neural networks, theory of computation, abstraction and creativity (these areas within the field of artificial intelligence are considered still relevant to the work of the field).

On May 26, 1956, McCarthy notified Robert Morison of the planned 11 attendees:

For the full period:

1) Dr. Marvin Minsky
2) Dr. Julian Bigelow
3) Professor D.M. Mackay
4) Mr. Ray Solomonoff
5) Mr. John Holland
6) Dr. John McCarthy

For four weeks:

7) Dr. Claude Shannon
8) Mr. Nathaniel Rochester
9) Mr. Oliver Selfridge

For the first two weeks:

10) Dr. Allen Newell
11) Professor Herbert Simon

He noted, "we will concentrate on a problem of devising a way of programming a calculator to form concepts and to form generalizations. This of course is subject to change when the group gets together."

The actual participants came at different times, mostly for much shorter times. Trenchard More replaced Rochester for three weeks and MacKay and Holland did not attend—but the project was set to begin.

Around June 18, 1956, the earliest participants (perhaps only Ray Solomonoff, maybe with Tom Etter) arrived at the Dartmouth campus in Hanover, N.H., to join John McCarthy who already had an apartment there. Solomonoff and Minsky stayed at Professors' apartments, but most would stay at the Hanover Inn.

== Dates ==
The Dartmouth Workshop is usually said to have run for six weeks. Ray Solomonoff's notes taken during the workshop, however, indicate that it ran for roughly eight weeks, from about June 18 to August 17. Solomonoff's notes start on June 22; June 28 mentions Minsky, June 30 mentions Hanover, N.H., July 1 mentions Tom Etter. On August 17, Solomonoff gave a final talk.

== Participants ==
Initially, McCarthy lost his list of attendees. Instead, after the workshop, McCarthy sent Solomonoff a preliminary list of participants and visitors plus those interested in the subject. 47 people were listed.

Solomonoff, however, made a list of participants in his notes of the summer project:

1. Ray Solomonoff
2. Marvin Minsky
3. John McCarthy
4. Claude Shannon
5. Trenchard More
6. Nat Rochester
7. Oliver Selfridge
8. Julian Bigelow
9. W. Ross Ashby
10. W.S. McCulloch
11. Abraham Robinson
12. Tom Etter
13. John Nash
14. David Sayre
15. Arthur Samuel
16. Kenneth R. Shoulders
17. Shoulders' friend
18. Alex Bernstein
19. Herbert Simon
20. Allen Newell

Shannon attended Solomonoff's talk on July 10 and Bigelow gave a talk on August 15. Solomonoff doesn't mention Bernard Widrow, but in 1994 Widrow said that he and an unidentified colleague from the same lab in MIT had attended for one week. In the same interview Widrow recalled that "I think [Wesley] Clark and [Belmont] Farley were there from Lincoln Lab." Trenchard mentions R. Culver and Solomonoff mentions Bill Shutz. Herb Gelernter didn't attend, but was influenced later by what Rochester learned.

In an article in IEEE Spectrum, Grace Solomonoff additionally identifies Peter Milner in a photo taken by Nathaniel Rochester in front of Dartmouth Hall.

Ray Solomonoff, Marvin Minsky, and John McCarthy were the only three who stayed for the full time. Trenchard took attendance during two weeks of his three-week visit. From three to about eight people would attend the daily sessions.

== Event and aftermath ==
They had the entire top floor of the Dartmouth Math Department to themselves, and most weekdays they would meet at the main math classroom where someone might lead a discussion focusing on his ideas, or more frequently, a general discussion would be held.

It was not a directed group research project; discussions covered many topics, but several directions are considered to have been initiated or encouraged by the Workshop: the rise of symbolic methods, systems focused on limited domains (early expert systems), and deductive systems versus inductive systems. One participant, Arthur Samuel, said, "It was very interesting, very stimulating, very exciting".

Ray Solomonoff kept notes giving his impression of the talks and the ideas from various discussions.

=== McCarthy's 1956 AI distribution list ===
This is the list in the "People Interested in the Artificial Intelligence Problem" document which McCarthy produced in 1956, partly in lieu of a list of attendees at the Dartmouth workshop. According to McCarthy the list was "being sent to the people on the list and a few others", and its purpose was "to let those on it know who is interested in receiving documents on the problem" of artificial intelligence. McCarthy also promised to deliver them a report on the Dartmouth conference, and to send an updated list soon afterwards. It includes people who did not attend the conference and does not include everyone who did attend it.

Entries in the distribution list
Original list		Further information		
Name as listed	Address as listed	Description (not from original)	Attended workshop?	Other
Adelson, Marvin	Hughes Aircraft Co. Intl. Airport Station, L.A. 45, Calif.			
Ashby, W.R.	Barnwood House, Gloucester, England		Yes (on Solomonoff's list of attendees)	
Backus, John	IBM Corporation, 590 Madison Ave., New York 22, New York.			
Bernstein, Alex	IBM Corporation, 590 Madison Ave, New York 22, New York		Yes (on Solomonoff's list of attendees)	
Bigelow, J.H.	Institute for Advanced Studies, Princeton, N.J.		Yes (on Solomonoff's list of attendees)	
Elias, Peter	R. L. E., MIT, Cambridge 39, Mass.			
Duda, W. L.	IBM, Research Lab., Poughkeepsie, N.Y.			
Davies, Paul M.	1317 C 18th St., Los Angeles, Calif.			
Fano, R.M.	R.L.E., M.I.T., Cambridge, Mass.			
Farley, B.G.	324 Park Ave., Arlington, Mass.		Possibly (in 1994 Widrow recalled that "I think [Wesley] Clark and Farley were there")	
Galanter, E.H.	University of Penna., Philadelphia, Pa.			
Gelernter, Herbert	IBM Research Lab., Poughkeepsie, N.Y.			
Glashow, Harvey A.	1102 Olivia St., Ann Arbor, Mich.			
Goertzal, Herbert	330 W 11th St., N.Y.			
Hagelbarger, D.	Bell Telephone Laboratories, Murray Hill,N.J.			
Miller, George A.	Memorial Hall, Harvard Univ., Cambridge 38, Mass.			
Harmon, Leon D.	Bell Tel. Laboratories, Murray Hill, N.J.			
Holland, John H.	E.R.I., University of Mich., Ann Arbor, Mich.			
Holt, Anatol	7358 Rural Lane, Phila., Pa.			
Kautz, William H.	Stanford Research Institute, Menlo Park, Calif.			
Luce, R.D.	427 W. 117th St., New York 27, N.Y.			
MacKay, Donald	Department of Physics, Univ. of London, London, W.C. 2, England.			
McCarthy, John	Dartmouth College, Hanover, N.H.		Yes (on Solomonoff's list of attendees)	
McCulloch, Warren S.	R.L.E., M.I.T., Cambridge, 39, Mass.		Yes (on Solomonoff's list of attendees)	
Melzak, Z.A.	Mathematics Dept., University of Mich., Ann Arbor, Mich.			
Minsky, M.L.	112 Newbury St, Boston, Mass.		Yes (on Solomonoff's list of attendees)	
More, Trenchard	Dept. of Elect. Eng., M.I.T., Cambridge, 39, Mass.		Yes (on Solomonoff's list of attendees)	
Nash, John	Institute for Advanced Studies, Princeton, N.J.		Yes (on Solomonoff's list of attendees)	
Newell, Allen	Department of Indust. Admin., Carnegie Institute of Techn., Pittsburgh, Pa.		Yes (on Solomonoff's list of attendees)	
Robinson, Abraham	Dept. of Math., Univ. of Toronto, Toronto, Ontario, Canada.		Yes (on Solomonoff's list of attendees)	
Rochester, Nathaniel	Eng. Res. Lab., IBM Corp., Poughkeepsie, N.Y.		Yes (on Solomonoff's list of attendees)	
Rogers, Hartley, Jr.	Department of Mathematics; MIT; Cambridge, MA.			
Rosenblith, Walter	R.L.E., M.I.T., Cambridge 39, Mass.			
Rothstein, Jerome	21 East Bergen Place, Red Bank, N.J.			
Sayre, David	IBM Corp., 590 Madison Ave., New York 22, N.Y.		Yes (on Solomonoff's list of attendees)	
Schorr-Kon, J.J.	C-380 Lincoln Laboratory, M.I.T., Lexington, Mass.			
Shapley, L.	Rand Corp., 1700 Main St., Santa Monica, California			
Schutzenberger, M.P.	R.L.E., M.I.T., Cambridge 39, Mass.			
Selfridge, O.G.	Lincoln Lab., M.I.T., Lexington, Mass.		Yes (on Solomonoff's list of attendees)	
Shannon, C.E.	R.L.E., M.I.T., Cambridge 39, Mass.		Yes (on Solomonoff's list of attendees)	
Shapiro, Norman	RAND Corp., 1700 Main St., Santa Monica, California			
Simon, Herbert A.	Dept. of Indust. Admin., Carnegie Tech. Pittsburgh, Pa.		Yes (on Solomonoff's list of attendees)	
Solomonoff, Raymond J.	Technical Research Group, 17 Union Square West, New York, N.Y.		Yes (on his own list of attendees)	
Webster, Frederick	62 Coolidge Ave., Cambridge 38, Mass.			
Moore, E.F.	Bell Tel. Lab. Murray Hill, N.J.			
Kemeny, John G.	Dartmouth College; Hanover, N.H.			
Steele, J.E., Capt. USAF(MC)	WADC, Area B., Box 8698, Wright-Patterson AFB, Ohio			

== See also ==
- Glossary of artificial intelligence
- History of artificial intelligence
- AI@50 – a 50th anniversary conference, including some of the original delegates.
