= Computing in Science & Engineering =

Technical magazine

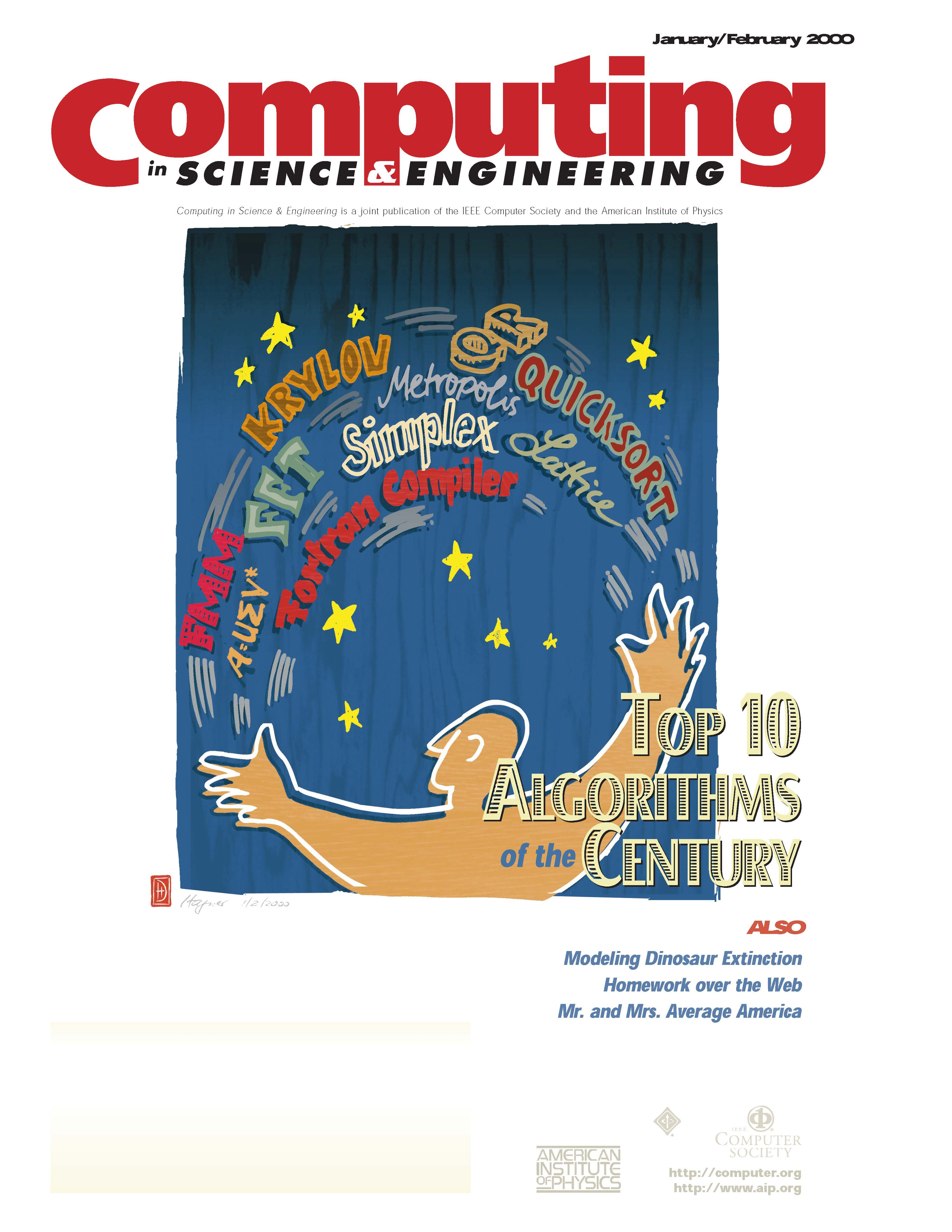
- Discipline: Computing science and engineering
- Language: English
- Edited by: Jeffrey Carver

Publication details
- History: Since 1999
- Publisher: IEEE
- Frequency: Quarterly
- Impact factor: 2.9 (2026)

Standard abbreviations
- ISO 4: Comput. Sci. Eng.

Indexing
- ISSN: 1541-1672 (print); 1941-1294 (web)

Links
- Journal homepage

Computing in Science & Engineering is a quarterly technical magazine published by the IEEE Computer Society. It was founded in 1999 from the merger of two publications: Computational Science & Engineering (CS&E) and Computers in Physics (CIP), the first published by IEEE and the second by the American Institute of Physics (AIP). Originally a bimonthly publication, it became quarterly in 2024. The founding editor-in-chief was George Cybenko, known for proving one of the first versions of the universal approximation theorem of neural networks.

The magazine is interdisciplinary and covers topics such as numerical simulation, modeling, and data analysis and visualization. CiSE aims to provide its readers with practical information on the latest developments in computational methods and their applications in science and engineering. Computing in Science & Engineering publishes peer-reviewed technical articles, special issues, editorials, and departments (regular columns).

== Notable articles ==
One of the most notable articles published in CiSE is "Matplotlib: A 2D Graphics Environment," by the late John D. Hunter. It shows more than 22 thousand full-text views and more than 17 thousand citations in IEEE Xplore, and more than 27 thousand citations in Google Scholar (checked August 14, 2023). A very popular department article is "What is the Blockchain?" by member of the editorial board Massimo DiPierro. Other notable articles include "Python for Scientific Computing" by Travis Oliphant, which has more than 15 thousand views in Xplore, and "The NumPy Array: A Structure for Efficient Numerical Computation," by Stefan van der Walt et al., with nearly 7 thousand citations and 12 thousand views in Xplore.

The winner of the CiSE 2021 Best Paper Award was "Jupyter: Thinking and Storytelling With Code and Data," by Brian E. Granger and Fernando Pérez.

== Notable editors ==
Among the editors emeritus, who served close to twenty years in the editorial board, is Jack Dongarra, Distinguished Professor of Computer Science at the University of Tennessee, and recipient of the IEEE Computer Society 2020 Computer Pioneer Award, and the 2021 ACM Alan Turing Award, among many other accolades. Cleve Moler, chairman and cofounder of MathWorks, was area editor for Software and a member of the editorial board from 1999. The precursor magazine, IEEE Computational Science & Engineering (CS&E), was founded by Ahmed Sameh, known for his contributions to parallel algorithms in numerical linear algebra, who remained in the CiSE board for several years. Dianne O'Leary, emeritus professor of computer science at the University of Maryland, was editor of the Your Homework Assignment column for several years starting on 2003. She compiled and expanded her columns into a book, "Scientific Computing with Case Studies," published by SIAM in 2009.
