= In situ adaptive tabulation =

Algorithm for approximating nonlinear relationships

In situ adaptive tabulation (ISAT) is an algorithm for the approximation of nonlinear relationships. ISAT is based on multiple linear regressions that are dynamically added as additional information is discovered. The technique is adaptive as it adds new linear regressions dynamically to a store of possible retrieval points. ISAT maintains error control by defining finer granularity in regions of increased nonlinearity. A binary tree search transverses cutting hyper-planes to locate a local linear approximation. ISAT is an alternative to artificial neural networks that is receiving increased attention for desirable characteristics, namely:

- scales quadratically with increased dimension
- approximates functions with discontinuities
- maintains explicit bounds on approximation error
- controls local derivatives of the approximating function
- delivers new data training without re-optimization

ISAT was first proposed by Stephen B. Pope for computational reduction of turbulent combustion simulation and later extended to model predictive control. It has been generalized to an ISAT framework that operates based on any input and output data regardless of the application. An improved version of the algorithm was proposed just over a decade later of the original publication, including new features that allow you to improve the efficiency of the search for tabulated data, as well as error control.

== See also ==
- Predictive analytics
- Radial basis function network
- Recurrent neural networks
- Support vector machine
- Tensor product network
