= AI@50 =

2006 artificial Intelligence conference

- Host country: Worldwide

AI@50, formally known as the "Dartmouth Artificial Intelligence Conference: The Next Fifty Years" (July 13–15, 2006), was a conference organized by James H. Moor, commemorating the 50th anniversary of the Dartmouth workshop which effectively inaugurated the history of artificial intelligence. Five of the original ten attendees were present: Marvin Minsky, Ray Solomonoff, Oliver Selfridge, Trenchard More, and John McCarthy.

While sponsored by Dartmouth College, General Electric, and the Frederick Whittemore Foundation, a $200,000 grant to George Cybenko from the Defense Advanced Research Projects Agency (DARPA) called for a report of the proceedings that would:

- Analyze progress on AI's original challenges during the first 50 years, and assess whether the challenges were "easier" or "harder" than originally thought and why
- Document what the AI@50 participants believe are the major research and development challenges facing this field over the next 50 years, and identify what breakthroughs will be needed to meet those challenges
- Relate those challenges and breakthroughs against developments and trends in other areas such as control theory, signal processing, information theory, statistics, and optimization theory.

A summary report by the conference director, James H. Moor, was published in AI Magazine.

== Conference Program ==
(videos of the talks are available online)

- James H. Moor, conference Director, Introduction
- Carol Folt and Barry Scherr, Welcome
- Carey Heckman, Tonypandy and the Origins of Science

=== AI: Past, Present, Future ===
- John McCarthy, What Was Expected, What We Did, and AI Today
- Marvin Minsky, The Emotion Machine

=== The Future Model of Thinking ===
- Ron Brachman and Hector Levesque, A Large Part of Human Thought
- David Mumford, What is the Right Model for 'Thought'?
- Stuart Russell, The Approach of Modern AI

=== The Future of Network Models ===
- Geoffrey Hinton & Simon Osindero, From Pandemonium to Graphical Models and Back Again
- Rick Granger, From Brain Circuits to Mind Manufacture

=== The Future of Learning & Search ===
- Oliver Selfridge, Learning and Education for Software: New Approaches in Machine Learning
- Ray Solomonoff, Machine Learning — Past and Future
- Leslie Pack Kaelbling, Learning to be Intelligent
- Peter Norvig, Web Search as a Product of and Catalyst for AI

=== The Future of AI ===
- Rod Brooks, Intelligence and Bodies
- Nils Nilsson, Routes to the Summit
- Eric Horvitz, In Pursuit of Artificial Intelligence: Reflections on Challenges and Trajectories

=== The Future of Vision ===
- Eric Grimson, Intelligent Medical Image Analysis: Computer Assisted Surgery and Disease Monitoring
- Takeo Kanade, Artificial Intelligence Vision: Progress and Non-Progress
- Terry Sejnowski, A Critique of Pure Vision

=== The Future of Reasoning ===
- Alan Bundy, Constructing, Selecting and Repairing Representations of Knowledge
- Edwina Rissland, The Exquisite Centrality of Examples
- Bart Selman, The Challenge and Promise of Automated Reasoning

=== The Future of Language and Cognition ===
- Trenchard More The Birth of Array Theory and Nial
- Eugene Charniak, Why Natural Language Processing is Now Statistical Natural Language Processing
- Pat Langley, Intelligent Behavior in Humans and Machines

=== The Future of the Future ===
- Ray Kurzweil, Why We Can Be Confident of Turing Test Capability Within a Quarter Century
- George Cybenko, The Future Trajectory of AI
- Charles J. Holland, DARPA's Perspective

=== AI and Games ===
- Jonathan Schaeffer, Games as a Test-bed for Artificial Intelligence Research
- Danny Kopec, Chess and AI
- Shay Bushinsky, Principle Positions in Deep Junior's Development

=== Future Interactions with Intelligent Machines ===
- Daniela Rus, Making Bodies Smart
- Sherry Turkle, From Building Intelligences to Nurturing Sensibilities

=== Selected Submitted Papers: Future Strategies for AI ===
- J. Storrs Hall, Self-improving AI: An Analysis
- Selmer Bringsjord, The Logicist Manifesto
- Vincent C. Müller, Is There a Future for AI Without Representation?
- Kristinn R. Thórisson, Integrated A.I. Systems

=== Selected Submitted Papers: Future Possibilities for AI ===
- Eric Steinhart, Survival as a Digital Ghost
- Colin T. A. Schmidt, Did You Leave That 'Contraption' Alone With Your Little Sister?
- Michael Anderson & Susan Leigh Anderson, The Status of Machine Ethics
- Marcello Guarini, Computation, Coherence, and Ethical Reasoning
