= Trenchard More =

Mathematician and Computer Scientist (1930-2019)

Trenchard More (1930 – 2019) was a mathematician and computer scientist who worked at IBM's Thomas J. Watson Research Center and Cambridge Scientific Center after teaching at MIT and Yale.

He was also a full professor for two years at the Technical University of Denmark.

He participated in the 1956 Dartmouth Summer Research Project on Artificial Intelligence. At the 50th year meeting of the Dartmouth Conference with Marvin Minsky, Ray Solomonoff, Geoffrey Hinton and Simon Osindero he presented The Future of Network Models and also gave a lecture entitled Routes to the Summit.

More designed a theory for nested rectangular arrays that provided a formal structure used in the development of APL2 and the Nested Interactive Array Language.

== See also ==
- AI@50
- Automaton
