= Oliver Selfridge =

British computer scientist (1926–2008)

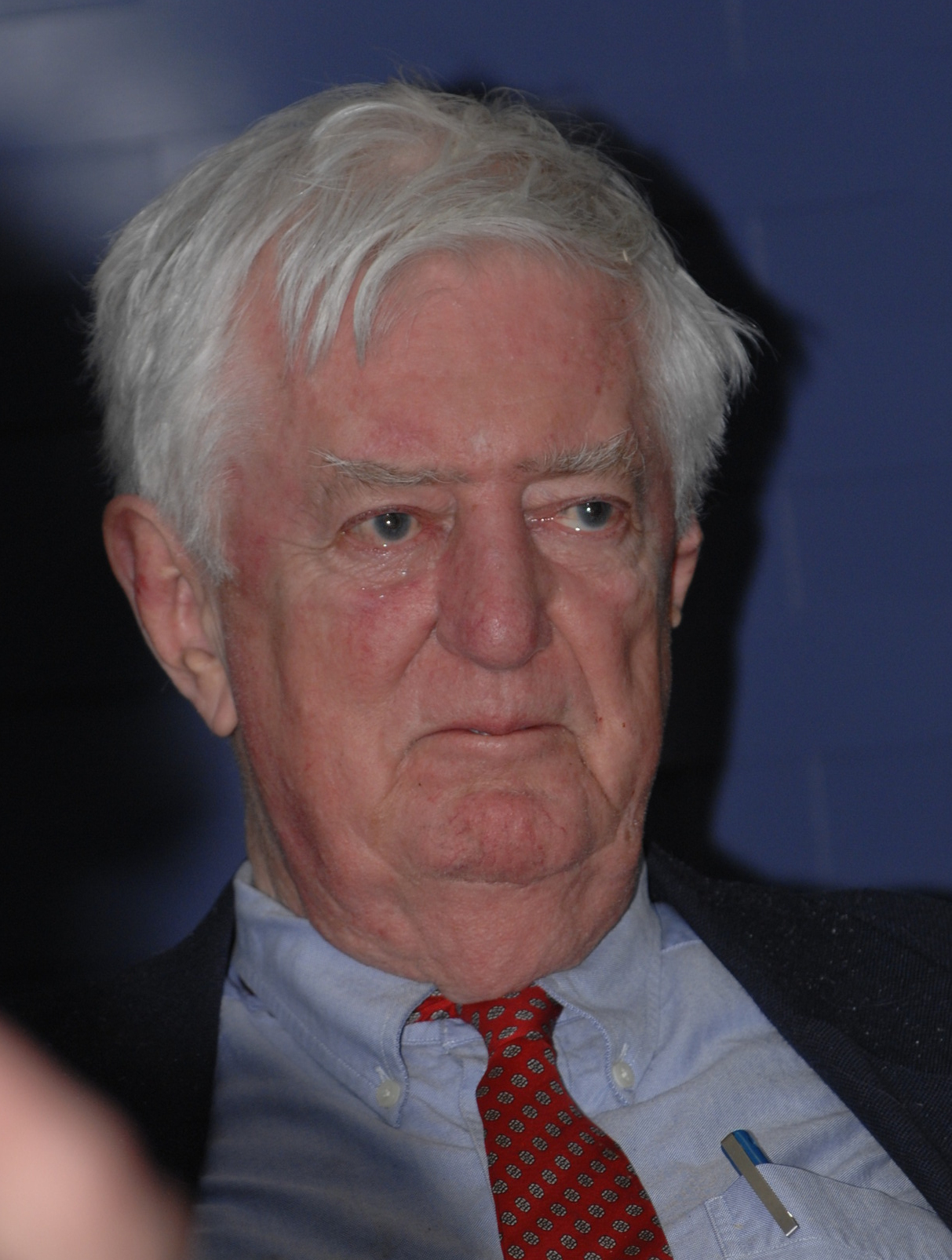
- Selfridge in 2008
- Born: Oliver Gordon Selfridge; May 10, 1926; London, England
- Died: December 3, 2008 (aged 82); Belmont, Massachusetts, U.S.
- Education: Massachusetts Institute of Technology (BS)
- Known for: Pandemonium Architecture
- Scientific career
- Fields: Mathematics, Computer science, Artificial Intelligence
- Workplaces: Signal Corps Laboratories; MIT; Lincoln Laboratories

Oliver Gordon Selfridge (10 May 1926 – 3 December 2008) was a British-American mathematician and computer scientist who pioneered the early foundations of modern artificial intelligence. He is mostly known for his 1959 paper, Pandemonium: A Paradigm For Learning describing what's now known as the Pandemonium Architecture. He has been called the "Father of Machine Perception."

== Early life and education ==
Selfridge, born in England, was a grandson of Harry Gordon Selfridge, the founder of Selfridges department stores. His father was Harry Gordon Selfridge Jr. and his mother was a clerk at Selfridge's store. He was educated at Malvern College, and, upon moving to the US, at Middlesex School in Concord, Massachusetts, before earning an S.B. from MIT in mathematics in 1945. He then became a graduate student of Norbert Wiener at MIT, but did not write up his doctoral research and never earned a Ph.D.

== Career ==
Marvin Minsky considered Selfridge to be one of his mentors, and Selfridge was one of the 11 attendees, with Minsky, of the Dartmouth workshop that is considered the founding event of artificial intelligence as a field.

Selfridge wrote important early papers on neural networks, pattern recognition, and machine learning, and his "Pandemonium" paper, published in 1959, is generally recognized as a classic in artificial intelligence. In it, Selfridge introduced the notion of "demons" that record events as they occur, recognize patterns in those events, and may trigger subsequent events according to patterns they recognize. Over time, this idea gave rise to aspect-oriented programming.

In 1968, in their formative paper "The Computer as a Communication Device", J. C. R. Licklider and Robert Taylor introduced a concept known as an OLIVER (On-Line Interactive Vicarious Expediter and Responder), which was named in honor of Selfridge.

Selfridge spent his career at Lincoln Laboratory, MIT (where he was Associate Director of Project MAC), Bolt, Beranek and Newman, and GTE Laboratories where he became Chief Scientist. He served on the NSA Advisory Board for 20 years, chairing the Data Processing Panel. In 1991 he was elected a Fellow of the Association for the Advancement of Artificial Intelligence. Selfridge retired in 1993.

In 2015, Duncan Campbell identified Selfridge as his "best source" for Campbell's 1980 reporting on US National Security Agency wiretapping activity at RAF Menwith Hill in England. Campbell described this operation in New Statesman as a "billion dollar phone tap".

Selfridge also authored four children's books: Sticks, Fingers Come In Fives, All About Mud, and Trouble With Dragons.

== Personal life ==
Selfridge was married and divorced twice and is survived by two daughters and two sons.

== See also ==
- Pandemonium architecture
