= George Cybenko =

American computer scientist

George Cybenko is the Dorothy and Walter Gramm Professor of Engineering at Dartmouth and a fellow of the IEEE, AAAS and SIAM.

== Education ==
Cybenko obtained his BA in mathematics from the University of Toronto in 1974 and received his PhD from Princeton in applied mathematics of electrical and computer engineering in 1978 under Bede Liu.

== Work ==
Cybenko served as an advisor for the Defense Science Board, the Air Force Scientific Advisory Board and the US Army Cyber Institute at West Point, among several other government panels. He was the founding editor-in-chief of IEEE Security & Privacy IEEE Computing in Science & Engineering, and the IEEE Transactions on Computational Social Systems journal. His current research interests are distributed information, control systems, and signal processing, with a focus on artificial consciousness and disambiguation of complex signals by intelligent systems. He is known for proving the universal approximation theorem for artificial neural networks with sigmoid activation functions.

Cybenko was the Principal Investigator for the DARPA award that funded the 2006 AI@50 conference.

== Awards ==
- SIAM Fellow (2020), "for contributions to theory and algorithms in signal processing, artificial neural networks, and distributed computing systems."
- SPIE Eric A. Lehrfeld Award (2016), for "work in cyber security including developing algorithms, analysis techniques, and tools to improve the state of the art in many areas, including computational behavior analysis, adversarial deception detection and dynamics, disclosure risk, and covert channels, and for his efforts in support of the SPIE Defense + Commercial Sensing symposium".
- US Air Force Commander's Service Award (2016)
- US Army Public Service Commendation Medal (2023)
- IEEE Fellow (1998), "for contributions to algorithms and theory of artificial neural networks in signal processing, and to theory and systems software for distributed and parallel computing."
- AAAS Fellow (2024) "for distinguished contributions to theory and algorithms in artificial neural networks, distributed computing systems and signal processing."
