= Kautz filter =

In signal processing, the Kautz filter, named after William H. Kautz, is a fixed-pole traversal filter, published in 1954.

Like Laguerre filters, Kautz filters can be implemented using a cascade of all-pass filters, with a one-pole lowpass filter at each tap between the all-pass sections.

== Orthogonal set ==
Given a set of real poles $\{-\alpha_1, -\alpha_2, \ldots, -\alpha_n\}$, the Laplace transform of the Kautz orthonormal basis is defined as the product of a one-pole lowpass factor with an increasing-order allpass factor:

$$\Phi_1(s) = \frac{\sqrt{2 \alpha_1}} {(s+\alpha_1)}$$

$$\Phi_2(s) = \frac{\sqrt{2 \alpha_2}} {(s+\alpha_2)} \cdot \frac{(s-\alpha_1)}{(s+\alpha_1)}$$

$$\Phi_n(s) = \frac{\sqrt{2 \alpha_n}} {(s+\alpha_n)} \cdot \frac{(s-\alpha_1)(s-\alpha_2) \cdots (s-\alpha_{n-1})}
{(s+\alpha_1)(s+\alpha_2) \cdots (s+\alpha_{n-1})}$$.

In the time domain, this is equivalent to

$$\phi_n(t) = a_{n1}e^{-\alpha_1 t} + a_{n2}e^{-\alpha_2 t} + \cdots + a_{nn}e^{-\alpha_n t}$$,

where a_{ni} are the coefficients of the partial fraction expansion as,

$$\Phi_n(s) = \sum_{i=1}^{n} \frac{a_{ni}}{s+\alpha_i}$$

For discrete-time Kautz filters, the same formulas are used, with z in place of s.

== Relation to Laguerre polynomials ==
If all poles coincide at s = -a, then Kautz series can be written as,
$\phi_k(t) = \sqrt{2a}(-1)^{k-1}e^{-at}L_{k-1}(2at)$,
where L_{k} denotes Laguerre polynomials.

== See also ==
- Kautz code
