= Joel Gelernter =

American psychiatric geneticist

Joel Eli Gelernter is an American psychiatric geneticist who is Foundations Fund Professor of Psychiatry and Professor of Genetics and of Neuroscience at the Yale School of Medicine. He received his B.S. degree from Yale University and his M.D. from SUNY Downstate Medical Center. His research focuses on the genetics of psychiatric disorders, such as drug dependence and substance use disorders.

Gelernter is the brother of David Gelernter, who is also a professor at Yale University. David was critically injured in a 1993 attack by the Unabomber, after which Joel received a phone call at his office in which the caller tells him "You are next". Initially, authorities suspected that the bomb that had injured David may have been meant for Joel, but it was later reported that they had "no reason to believe" Joel was the intended target.
