= Mark Gelernter =

Mark Gelernter is an American academic, architectural historian, and writer. He was the Dean of the College of Architecture and Planning of the University of Colorado, Denver. He also taught at the college.

== Publications ==
- Sources of Architectural Form: A Critical History of Western Design Theory
- A History of American Architecture: Buildings in Their Cultural and Technological Context

In addition Dr. Gelernter has published numerous articles on architectural history, theory, and design education, in both the US and in United Kingdom. Gelernter’s papers on design education generally explore how the design skill is acquired, and how design education might be changed to teach the design skill more effectively.
