= Tensor product network =

A tensor product network, in artificial neural networks, is a network that exploits the properties of tensors to model associative concepts such as variable assignment. Orthonormal vectors are chosen to model the ideas (such as variable names and target assignments), and the tensor product of these vectors construct a network whose mathematical properties allow the user to easily extract the association from it.

== See also ==
- Neural network
