= Herbert Gelernter =

American computer scientist

Herbet Leo Gelernter
- Born: December 17, 1929
- Died: May 28, 2015 (aged 85)
- Occupation: Professor

Academic background
- Education: University of Rochester

Academic work
- Discipline: Computer Science
- Institutions: Stony Brook University
- Notable works: Geometry Theorem Prover

Herbert Leo Gelernter (December 17, 1929 – May 28, 2015) was a professor in the Computer Science Department of Stony Brook University.

== Short biography ==
Having taken his B.S. in 1951 from Brooklyn College, Gelernter received his Ph.D. at the University of Rochester in 1957.

Gelernter's extended visit to the European Organization for Nuclear Research (CERN) in 1960/61, while he was developing a prototype of his 'vidicon' (a system which dispensed with film, and used a television-camera tube to record a spark-chamber event and store it as digitized data on magnetic tape) stimulated the development of a data-handling system for spark chambers in early 1961.

During his time at IBM, he wrote some of the first artificial intelligence software—his "geometry theorem machine" was the first advanced AI program, and the third AI program ever. It is a logical AI system that can prove theorems in planar geometry about parallel lines, congruence, and equality and inequality of segments and angles. Like Logic Theorist, it uses heuristics.

He implemented, with Nathaniel Rochester, a computer language for list processing within FORTRAN. The work for this was done with Carl Gerberich at IBM, to this end producing the Fortran list processing language (FLPL).

At Stony Brook University, Gelernter led the development of SYNCHEM, an expert system that searched for synthetic routes to organic molecules. It used a knowledge base of graph transforms, rules, and heuristics representing organic reactions grouped by functional group.

In 1952, Gelernter married Ruth, a daughter of rabbi Theodore Norton Lewis. His sons are the geneticist and Yale professor Joel Gelernter and the computer scientist and social commentator David Gelernter, also a Yale professor. His daughter Judith is a research scientist in the Information Technology Laboratory at the National Institute of Standards and Technology.

Gelernter died on May 28, 2015.

== See also ==
- List of Jewish American computer scientists
- History of artificial intelligence
- Timeline of artificial intelligence
