= DoD NDSEG Fellowship =

American science and engineering fellowship

National Defense Science and Engineering Graduate Fellowship Program
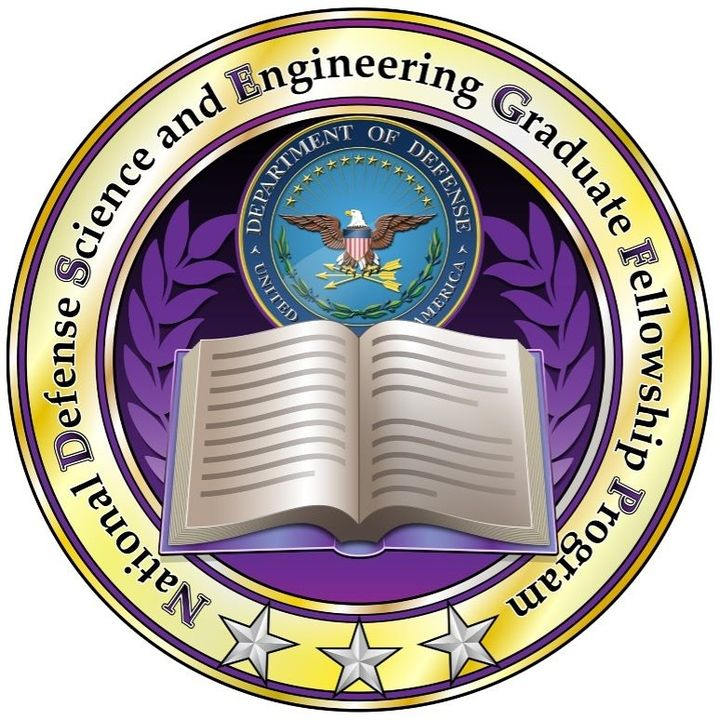
- Type: Fellowship
- Awarded By: U.S. Department of Defense
- Sponsors: Air Force Office of Scientific Research (AFOSR) Office of Naval Research (ONR) Army Research Office (ARO)
- Country: United States
- First Awarded: 1989; 33 years ago
- Award Amount: 3 years $43,200 (USD) annual stipend, 3 years tuition for PhD programs in science and engineering
- Frequency of Selection: Annual
- Number of Recipients: About 150
- Website: ndseg.org

The Department of Defense National Defense Science and Engineering Graduate Fellowship (DoD NDSEG) is a fellowship awarded annually to U.S. citizens pursuing doctoral degrees in science and engineering disciplines. The highly competitive fellowship is sponsored by the U.S. Navy, U.S. Space Force, U.S. Air Force, and U.S. Army. These agencies make the final selection of the fellows. National Defense Fellows must be enrolled in research-based doctoral degrees aligned with the goals of the U.S. Department of Defense as outlined in a specific solicitation for research proposals, known as a Broad Agency Announcement (BAA). Qualifying doctoral programs must be based in the United States. The NDSEG Fellowship lasts for three years, paying for full tuition and all mandatory fees in that period. The fellowship also awards the recipient a monthly stipend, totaling $40,800 annually, a $5,000 travel budget for the 3-year tenure, and a $1,400 annual health insurance budget. National Defense Fellows have no military service obligation upon completion of the program. In the 2020-2021 award cycle, 159 fellows were chosen from a pool of over 7,942 applicants, for a selection rate of roughly 2%.

== Award history and details ==
An act of Congress established the NDSEG Fellowship in 1989, requiring that fellows be selected "solely on the basis of academic ability." Over 4,000 fellowships have been granted since 1989 and over 60,000 applications have been received, for an acceptance rate below 7%.

Each Fellow's grant is supported by a specific agency of the Department of Defense. The Office of Naval Research (ONR) is responsible for the science and technology programs of the United States Navy and United States Marine Corps; awarding typically between 30 and 60 fellowships each year. The Vice Chief of Naval Research also serves as the Commanding General of the Marine Corps Warfighting Laboratory (MCWL). The Air Force Office of Scientific Research (AFOSR) manages the Air Force program. Applicants selecting the U.S. Army as their preferred agency may choose from BAAs for the Army Research Office (ARO), Engineer Research and Development Center (ERDC), or United States Army Medical Research and Development Command (USAMRDC).

The $40,800 annual stipend is paid directly to National Defense Fellows on a monthly basis. There are no earmarks or usage requirements for this stipend. Fellows are required to participate in the NDSEG Fellows Conference in their 2nd year of tenure as a fellow. Travel for conferences or professional development may be charged to the $5,000 travel budget, for which the mandatory Fellows Conference qualifies. Tuition payments and fees are paid directly to universities by the NDSEG program office. The NDSEG Fellowship allows awardees to transfer the fellowship title and funding to different universities, allowing them to choose whichever institution they wish to attend.

== Eligibility and application requirements ==
Applicants must be citizens of the United States (including dual citizens) or U.S. nationals who have completed a qualifying undergraduate degree prior to the start of the fellowship. In order to receive the fellowship, students must be accepted to or enrolled in a qualifying doctoral program. It is possible to apply for the DoD NDSEG Fellowship while applying to graduate programs, but receipt of the grant and fellowship is contingent on acceptance and enrollment into the graduate program.

U.S. citizens enrolled in dual MD-PhD programs qualify to apply for the NDSEG Fellowship; but pure Doctor of Medicine programs do not qualify. Unlike the NSF-GRFP, It is possible to apply for the NDSEG Fellowship after completing a Master's degree. Students enrolled in PhD programs which award a master's degree en route qualify to apply.

The application for the DoD NDSEG Fellowship requires students to apply to a specific Broad Agency Announcement (BAA) within the Department of Defense. BAAs outline research and scientific goals identified by a given branch of the U.S. Military, and solicit research proposals or grants. Applicants must identify a BAA that funds the aims of their own research. BAAs may be specific to a particular branch of the U.S. Military or apply to multiple branches. Applicants are required to submit a 4-page single-spaced research proposal, with a maximum of one page for cited work. Applicants must submit 3 professional/academic references and academic records.

As of 2021, qualifying research program areas include:

- Aeronautical and Astronautical Engineering
- Biomedical Engineering
- Biosciences (includes toxicology)
- Chemical Engineering
- Chemistry
- Civil Engineering
- Cognitive, Neural, and Behavioral Sciences
- Computer and Computational Sciences
- Electrical Engineering
- Geosciences (Includes Terrain, Water, and Air)
- Materials Science and Engineering
- Mathematics
- Mechanical Engineering
- Naval Architecture and Ocean Engineering (Includes Undersea Systems)
- Oceanography (Includes Ocean Acoustics, Remote Sensing, and Marine Meteorology)
- Physics (Includes Optics)
- Space Physics

== Additional information ==
The DoD NDSEG Fellowship is often compared to the National Science Foundation Graduate Research Fellowship Program (NSF-GRFP). The NDSEG Fellowship is unlike the GRFP in that it cannot be deferred, and that NDSEG Fellows are paid through a contracting agency of the DoD rather than through the university in which the fellow is enrolled. The NDSEG Fellowship is managed by Innovative Technology Solutions of Dayton, Ohio. The fellowship has previously been managed by the American Society for Engineering Education (ASEE), STI-TEC, and Systems Plus.

== Notable recipients ==
- David R. Liu, Thomas Dudley Cabot Professor of the Natural Sciences at Harvard University
- Reid Barton, four-time International Mathematical Olympiad gold medalist and four-time Putnam Fellow
- Emily Fairfax, Assistant Professor of Geography at the University of Minnesota and Saint Anthony Falls Laboratory
- Michael J. Freedman, Robert E. Kahn Professor of Computer Science at Princeton University
- Neil Garg, Kenneth N. Trueblood Endowed Chair in Chemistry & Biochemistry at UCLA
- Forrest Iandola, co-inventor of SqueezeNet neural network and co-founder of DeepScale
- Steven G. Johnson, Professor of Applied Mathematics and Physics at MIT
- Jonathan Katz, Professor of Computer Science at the University of Maryland
- Daniel M. Kane, two-time International Mathematical Olympiad gold medalist and Professor of Mathematics and Computer Science and Engineering at UC San Diego
- Kiran Kedlaya, Stefan E. Warschawski Chair in Mathematics at UC San Diego
- Mark J. Lewis, aerospace engineer and 31st Chief Scientist of the United States Air Force
- Erez Lieberman-Aiden, Associate Professor of Molecular and Human Genetics at the Baylor College of Medicine
- Hideo Mabuchi, 2000 MacArthur Fellow and Professor of Applied Physics at Stanford University
- Charles Musgrave, Robert H. Davis Professor of Chemical and Biological Engineering at the University of Colorado Boulder
- Lenhard Ng, two-time International Mathematical Olympiad gold medalist and professor of mathematics at Duke University
- SonBinh Nguyen, Professor of Chemistry at Northwestern University
- Emma Pierson, Assistant Professor of Computer Science at Cornell University
- Alia Sabur, world's youngest professor
- Amit Sahai, Symantec Chair Professor of Computer Science at UCLA
- Ivan Selesnick, Electrical and Computer Engineering Department Chair at New York University
- Kevin Skadron, Harry Douglas Forsyth Professor of Computer Science at the University of Virginia
- Salil Vadhan, Vicky Joseph Professor of Computer Science and Applied Mathematics at Harvard University
- Joshua Weitz, Professor of Biology and Clark Leadership Chair in Data Analytics at the University of Maryland
- Lauren K. Williams, Dwight Parker Robinson Professor of Mathematics at Harvard University
- Daniela Witten, COPSS Awardee and Dorothy Gilford Endowed Chair of Mathematical Statistics at the University of Washington
- Melanie Wood, Professor of Mathematics at Harvard University

== See also ==
- Hertz Fellowship
- Computational Science Graduate Fellowship
- NSF Graduate Research Fellowship
- SMART Defense Scholarship
- USDA NIFA Fellowship Program
