= Montgomery Blair High School =

Location
- 51 University Boulevard East; Silver Spring, Maryland 20901; United States; 39°1′5″N 77°0′41″W

Information
- Type: Public (magnet) high school
- Motto: Crescens Scientia (To Expand Knowledge)
- Established: 1925; 101 years ago
- School district: Montgomery County Public Schools (MCPS)
- CEEB code: 210965
- NCES School ID: 240048000877
- Principal: Damon A. Monteleone
- Teaching staff: 195.20 FTE (2023-24)
- Grades: 9–12
- Enrollment: 3,261 (2023-24)
- Student to teacher ratio: 16.71 (2023-24)
- Campus size: 42-acre (170,000 m^{2})
- Campus type: Large suburb
- Colors: Red and white
- Athletics: 23 varsity sports
- Athletics conference: MPSSAA 4A
- Mascot: Blazer
- Rival: Northwood High School
- Publication: InfoFlow; Silver Quill; SilverQuest; Silver Splinter
- Newspaper: Silver Chips; Silver Chips Online
- Yearbook: Silverlogue
- Website: www.mbhs.edu
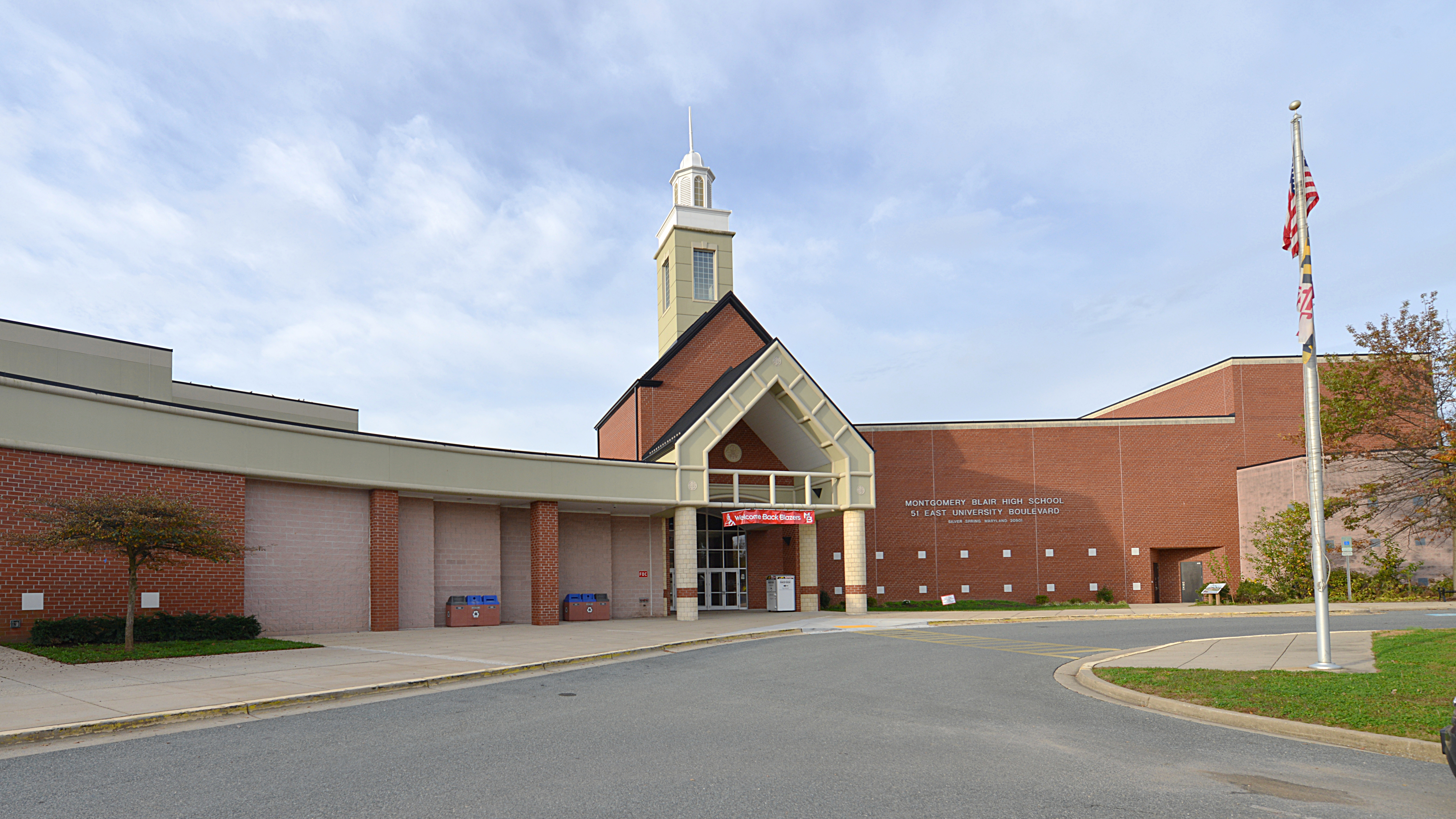

Montgomery Blair High School (MBHS) is a public high school in the Four Corners neighborhood of Silver Spring, Maryland, United States. It is operated by Montgomery County Public Schools. With more than 3,200 students, it has the largest enrollment of any high school in the state of Maryland.

The school is named for Montgomery Blair, a lawyer who represented Dred Scott in his Supreme Court case and later served as Postmaster General under President Abraham Lincoln. Opened in 1925 as Takoma Park–Silver Spring High School, the school changed its name in 1935 when it moved to 313 Wayne Avenue overlooking Sligo Creek in Silver Spring. In 1998, the school moved two miles (3 km) north to the Kay Tract, a long-vacant site just north of the Capital Beltway.

About 20% of the student body is part of one of two magnet programs: the Science, Math, and Computer Science Magnet; and the Communication Arts Program (CAP), which draw students from the Silver Spring area and across Montgomery County. The school is a founding member of the National Consortium of STEM Schools.

== History ==
=== Philadelphia–Chicago campus era (1925–1935) ===
The school opened in 1925 as Takoma–Silver Spring High School with 86 students. The 3.8-acre (15,000 m^{2}) campus sat at the corner of Philadelphia Avenue and Chicago Avenue in suburban Takoma Park, Maryland.

By the end of the 1920s, the school had added a junior high school (8th and 9th grades) to its senior high school (10th through 12th grades). Growing along with the communities of Silver Spring and Takoma Park, it eventually encompassed kindergarten to 12th grade. By 1934, the school was over-capacity with 450 students, and so, in 1935, the 10th, 11th, and 12 grades moved to a new high school named Montgomery Blair Senior High School. For a time, students, teachers, and administrators commuted between the two campuses. The annual yearbook, ‘’Silverlogue’’, was established around this time.

=== Wayne Avenue campus era (1935–1998) ===
When Montgomery Blair High School's 23.5-acre (95,000 m^{2}) Wayne Avenue campus opened in March 1935, it was the sixth high school in Montgomery County, and the first in the lower county. One of several Montgomery County schools designed during that period by Howard Wright Cutler, the facility then consisted only of the C building, overlooking Sligo Creek.

In 1936, the Auxiliary Gymnasium was added, followed by the B building in 1940, and the D building in 1942. MBHS's first football team was founded in 1944, and the War Memorial Stadium opened in 1947. In 1950, the A building was constructed, containing the Blair Library/Media Center. With the addition of the Main Gymnasium/Fieldhouse in 1954, MBHS possessed one of the finest basketball and football facilities in the county. The E building was added in 1959 as an administrative section, followed by the 1969 opening of the 1200-seat auditorium, named for long-time teacher and librarian Elizabeth Stickley. The most recent addition was the automotive shop building in 1973.

During World War II, students from the University of Maryland taught several classes, and in some cases, able senior students taught sophomore classes. The Blair Library created the "Senior Corner" to honor those who died in war. Life magazine featured the school's Victory Corps close order drill team. Before to the Supreme Court decision in Brown v. Board of Education, Blair was an all-white school. In 1955, the school began to integrate along with the rest of Montgomery County.

With Silver Spring's growth, Blair's enrollment jumped from 600 students in 1946, to 1900 by 1956, peaking at 2900 in 1965 before being reduced from 1700 to 1400 after rezoning in 1982. Enrollment was around 1,800 when the Science, Mathematics, and Computer Science Magnet program brought 80 new students in the fall of 1985. The Communication Arts Program (CAP) followed in 1987, founded by Alicia Coleman, brought 75 new students. Overcrowding became an issue for Montgomery Blair High School, as portable buildings covered what was once open land and enrollment exceeded the building's capacity of 2,000.

Blair is one of the few U.S. high schools with a .edu domain name, with its internet connection having gone live in the late 1980s.

=== Four Corners campus era (1998–present) ===
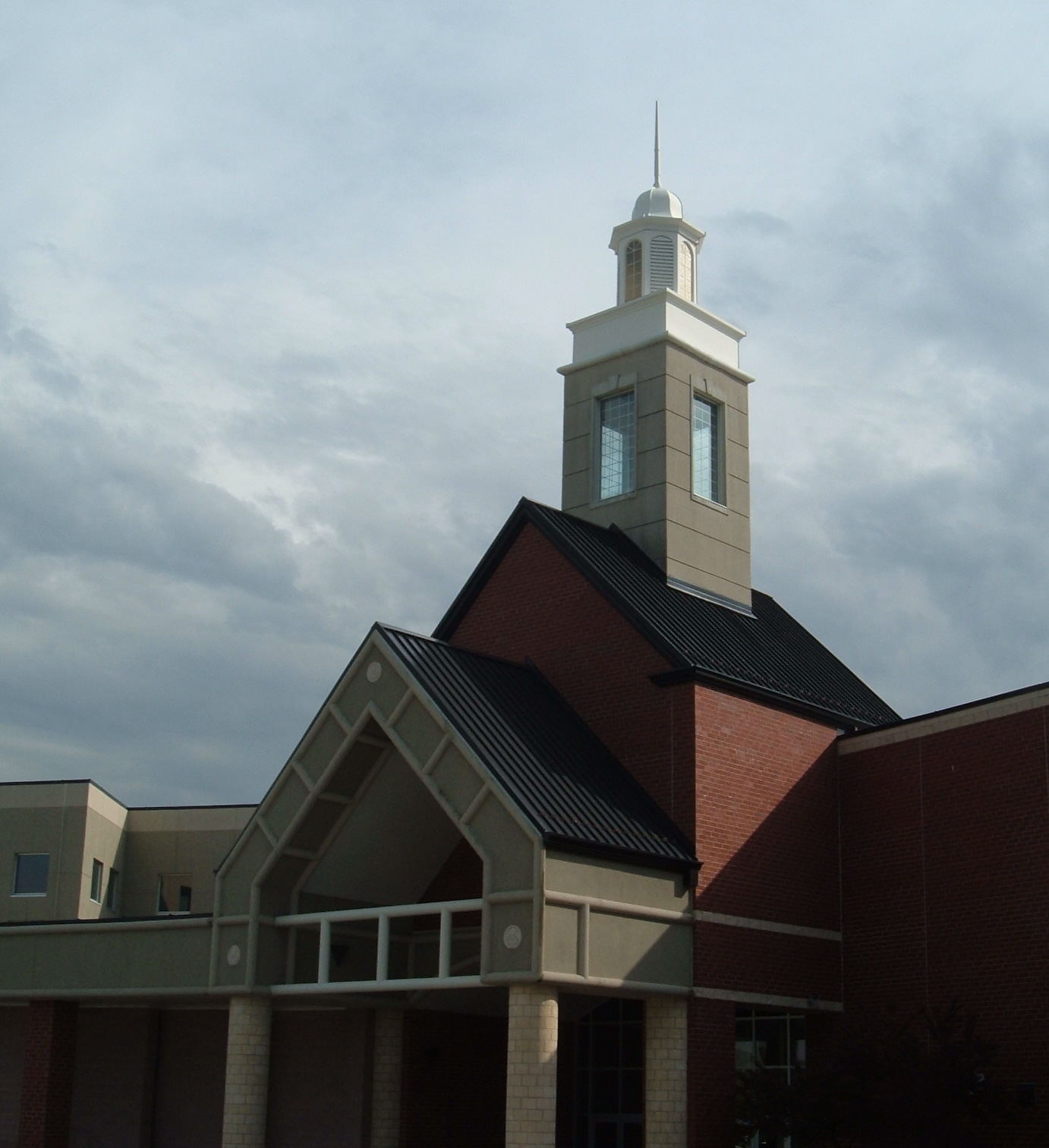
The cupola and steeple at the school's Four Corners campus

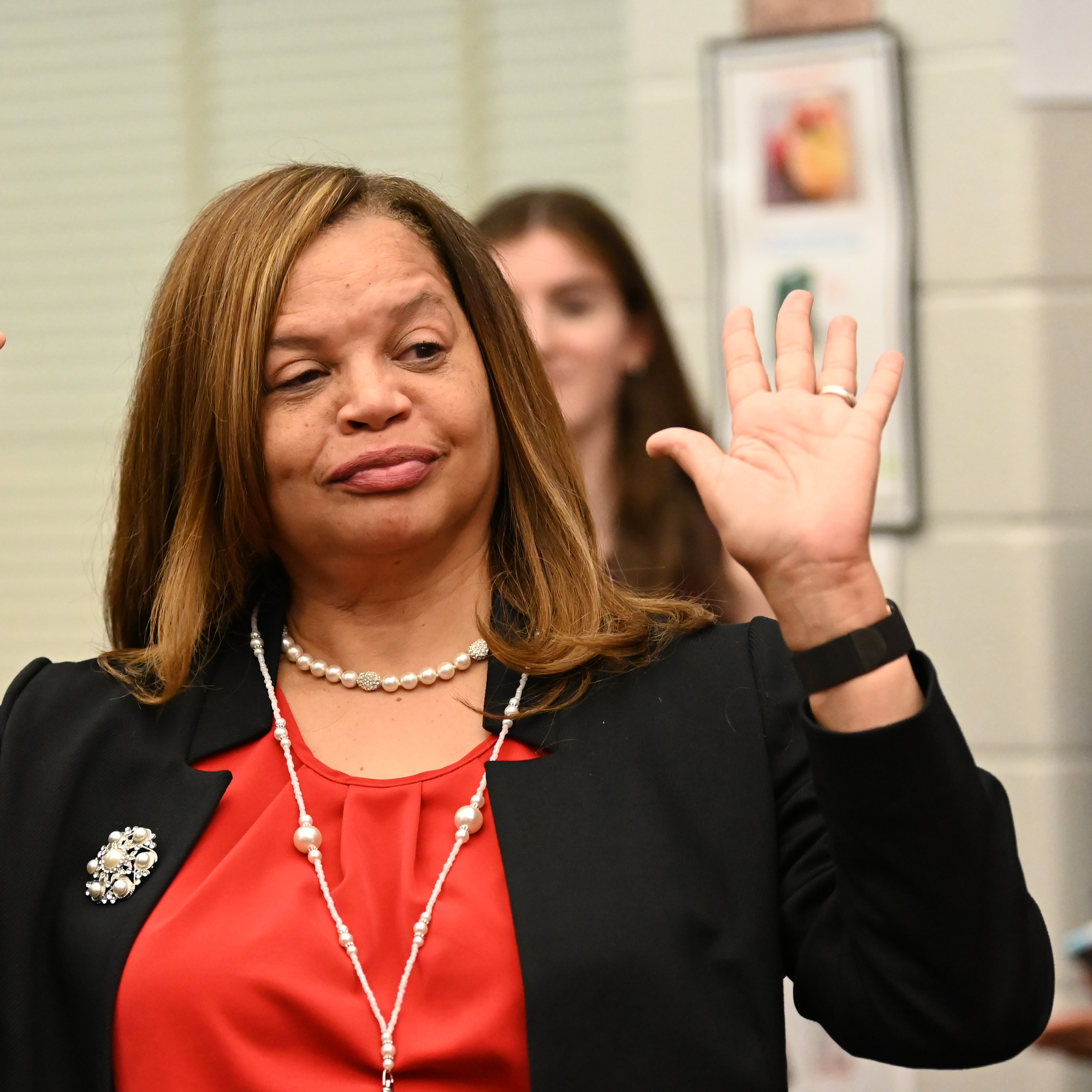
Renay Johnson, the first female principal of Blair

In 1994, construction began on a new campus on an empty tract of land 1.5 miles (2.4 km) north of the Wayne Avenue campus, at the intersection of University Boulevard, Colesville Road, and the Capital Beltway.

In fall 1998, Blair opened on the 42-acre (170,000 m^{2}) Four Corners campus, the largest high-school campus in the county and nearly twice as large as the old Wayne Avenue site. It was designed for 2,830 students.

Blair's Wayne Avenue campus was converted into an elementary and middle school; currently, Sligo Creek Elementary School and Silver Spring International Middle School. The Elizabeth Stickley Auditorium was not included in the conversion plans, and has remained closed and deteriorating since 1997. Several local politicians and leaders, including former Maryland state senator Ida Ruben, current U.S. representative Jamie Raskin and former U.S. Senator Barbara Mikulski, have endorsed projects to restore the auditorium to its former condition.

During the early to mid-2000s, the school population spiked to 3,400 students, with the overflow handled by up to eight portable classrooms. Enrollment decreased slightly due to the opening of other schools and the creation of the Downcounty Consortium. Two portables were removed at the beginning of the 2006–2007 school year, and all were gone by April 2010, when enrollment was 2,788. Enrollment has rebounded to about 3,200 students, making Blair the largest public school in Maryland.

In 2008, digital Promethean provided boards to many classrooms.

In 2011, Renay Johnson was appointed as the first woman to lead the school. She decided to retire at the end of the 2023-24 school year having completed 33 years of teaching. The school appointed Damon Monteleone as the new principal. Adrianna Burgos, the current assistant principal, served as acting principal from July 1, 2024, until August 14, 2024. Kevin Yates, the principal at Damascus High School, took over as acting principal at Blair for the 2024-2025 school year. Damon Monteleone currently serves as principal.

== Notable events ==
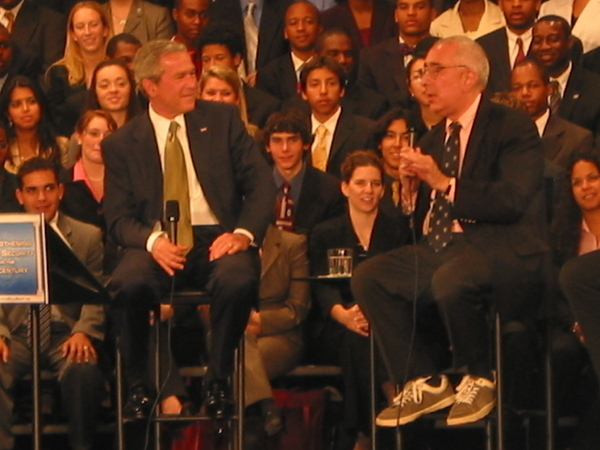
Then-U.S. President George W. Bush and Ben Stein, a 1962 alumnus of the school, at a June 2005 event at the school

In April 1992, Montgomery Blair High School was the first high school in the United States to sponsor a display of the NAMES Project AIDS Memorial Quilt. More than 5,000 children, their families, teachers and friends came to see the Quilt.

The school has been a stop for politicians because of the school's diversity, strong academic programs, and proximity to the nation's capital. Some notable visits include:

- February 5, 1998: President Bill Clinton and UK Prime Minister Tony Blair
- March 7, 2003: United States Secretary of Homeland Security Tom Ridge and Secretary of Education Rod Paige
- June 1, 2016: Secretary of State John Kerry discussed ocean conservation

On June 23, 2005, President George W. Bush held a town-hall-style event at the school on short notice to promote his plan to partially privatize Social Security. Students and the general public were barred from attending. About 400 community members, students, and union members protested Bush's proposals on the public sidewalk outside the school, rebuffing police attempts to persuade them to move to a park more than a block away.

During the 2010–2011 school year, NBA Hall of Famer Kareem Abdul-Jabbar spoke to a packed auditorium of students about his upcoming film and his life, then privately with the varsity and junior varsity basketball teams.

On February 26, 2018, U.S. Congressmen Jamie Raskin and Ted Deutch brought survivors of the Parkland high school shooting to meet with Blair students.

In November 2021, one student stabbed another in the staff parking lot during a school day. The victim was taken to the hospital and recovered from his wounds; the perpetrator was charged with attempted second-degree murder, first-degree assault, and reckless endangerment.

In October 2023, three school days were delayed or disrupted by phoned-in bomb threats that were discovered to be hoaxes by a 12-year-old child. A similar swatting call was made on February 4, 2026.

On January 23, 2026, Ian MacKaye visited the school to speak to Blair Album Club, the school's student-led music forum club, about his experiences as a pioneer in the Washington, D.C., hardcore scene.

== Campus ==
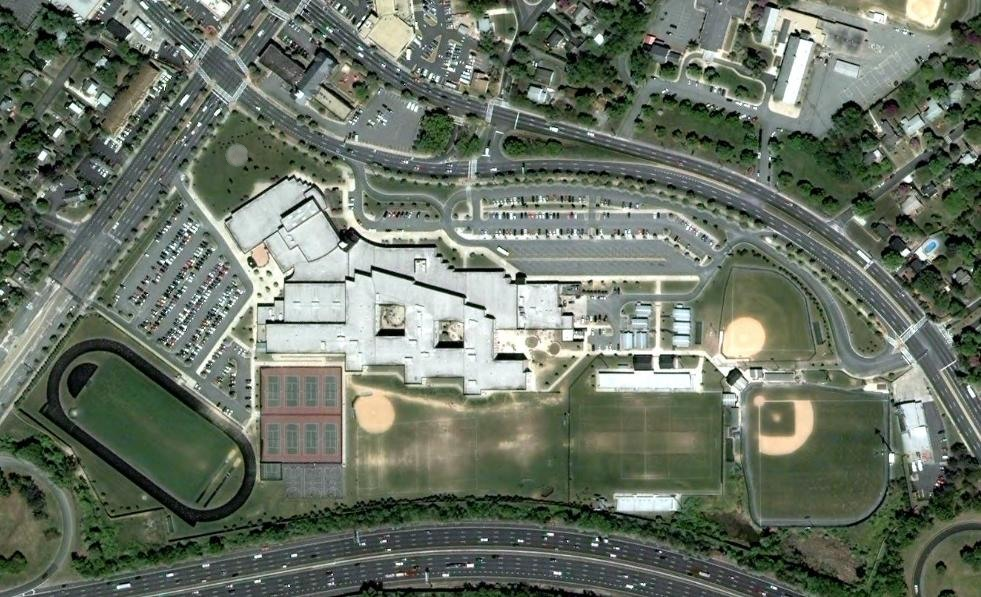
An aerial photograph of Four Corners campus (2011, now outdated)

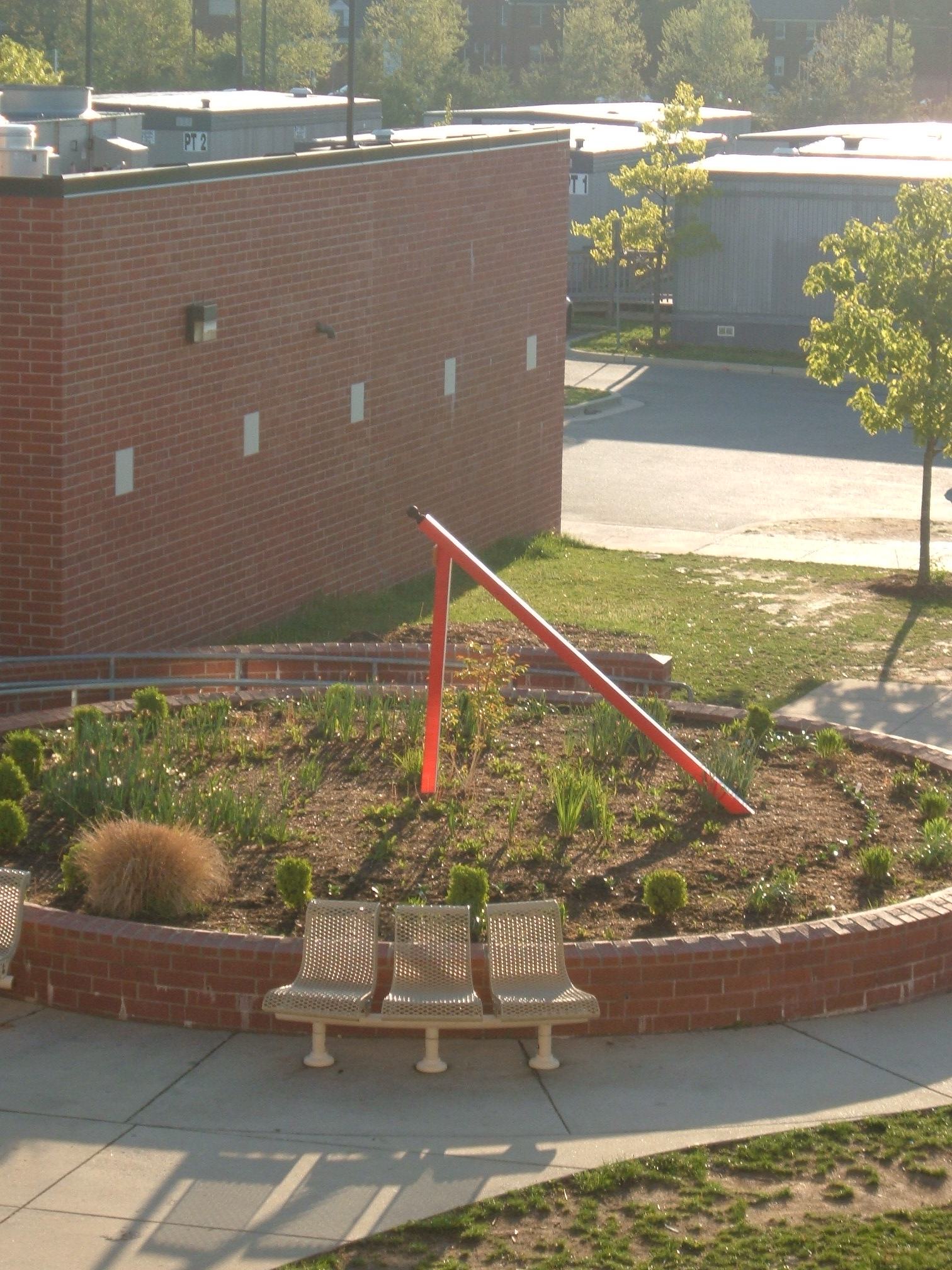
A sundial was added to the school's main courtyard in March 2006

The school's campus covers 42 acres between the Capital Beltway, U.S. Route 29, and Maryland Route 193 in Silver Spring's Four Corners neighborhood. The school was completed in 1998 and contains 378,000 sq ft (35,100 m^{2}) of space, originally designed for 2,800 students.

Eight portable classrooms were erected and then removed in the 2010s as student population grew and then receded. Four new portables were added in the 2017–2018 school year to handle another enrollment spike. The population has continued to grow, and as of June 2026, there are 19 portables.

The school has baseball and softball fields to the east of the main building as well as Blazer Stadium which serves as the home of the school's football, soccer, field hockey, and lacrosse teams.

The main building has three courtyards and a 750-seat auditorium. A greenhouse and accompanying patio is on the second floor on the west side for horticulture classes. The main hallway of the school, "Blair Boulevard," displays flags from many countries, representing its diverse student body.

== Academics ==
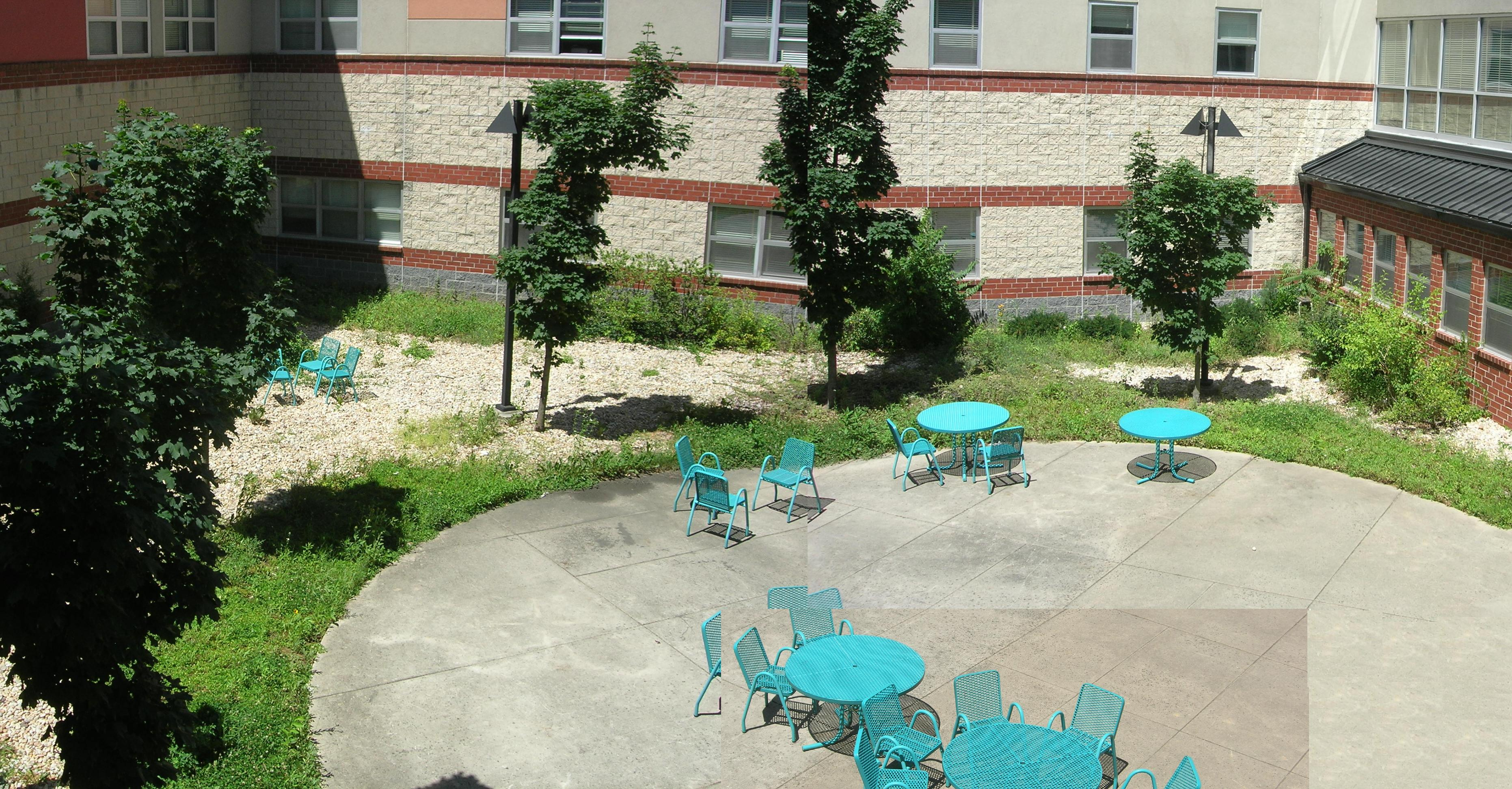
The school's faculty courtyard

In 2025, MBHS was ranked 42nd in Maryland and 2,430 nationally by U.S. News & World Report. The school has an Honors Program and an Advanced Placement Program.

=== Science, Mathematics, and Computer Science Magnet program ===
In 1985, Montgomery County Public Schools opened its first Science, Mathematics, and Computer Science Magnet program at Blair. At the time, Blair had the highest minority population among the high schools in the county and the lowest standardized test scores. The school board conducted a survey to decide that a specialized science magnet program would attract high-achieving white and Asian students to Blair. Although there was criticism of the program from some parents and students, the leaders of the PTA and the principal supported the program, noting that by 1989 more families were staying in the neighborhood to attend Blair and fewer students were seeking to transfer out. In 1993, Montgomery County Public Schools superintendent Paul Vance told The New York Times, "I have never seen a high school's image turn around so quickly."

The Magnet offers accelerated, interdisciplinary courses in science, mathematics, and computer science. All Magnet students are required to complete a rigorous core curriculum in their 9th and 10th grades consisting of the physical, chemical, biological, and earth and space sciences; mathematics, including precalculus and calculus; computer science; and interdisciplinary research, engineering, and technology courses. In their 11th and 12th grades, Magnet students may opt to enroll in dozens of elective courses; selected courses include Quantum Physics, Complex Analysis, Computer Modeling and Simulation, Thermodynamics, Discrete Mathematics, Logic, Marine Biology, Computer Graphics, Artificial Intelligence, Mathematical Physics, Linear Algebra, and Organic Chemistry. Qualified students who are not in the Magnet may enroll in its electives, provided they meet the appropriate prerequisites. In their senior year, Magnet students complete a Senior Research Project and may enter the Regeneron Science Talent Search, in which the program has a long history of success. Magnet class of 2026 students had a mean SAT score of 1515 and a mean composite ACT score of 35.

The Magnet is open to students from the southern and eastern areas of Montgomery County, who are selected through a competitive application and testing process. A program at Poolesville High School provides a similar curriculum for students in the northern and western areas of the county.

The Magnet program has been criticized for being overwhelmingly white and Asian, enrolling few black and Hispanic students. The Magnet was threatened with proposed budget cuts in 2008, but after student protests, the most severe cuts were repealed.

In 2018, a retired Magnet teacher was accused of sexual harassment by many former students.

=== Communication Arts Program ===
Another magnet program, the Communication Arts Program (CAP), was established at Blair in 1988. It strives to provide a comprehensive educational approach to the humanities by offering accelerated, interdisciplinary courses in English, social studies, and media for participating students. CAP is open to students in the Downcounty Consortium and admission is competitive by application including a short essay.

CAP offers courses in drama, photography, video production, history, government, English literature, writing composition, journalism and research. The number of CAP classes decreases by year, until students only complete one CAP class in 12th grade. Freshmen and sophomores are sorted into cohorts with which they will attend all of their CAP classes. The curriculum frequently builds off of existing Advanced Placement courses but uses the program's resources to add interdisciplinary experiences, such as a simulated presidential election that occurs over the course of a week at end of 10th grade, in which some students serve as candidates and others as campaign staff and reporters. CAP students also maintain portfolios of their work throughout the four years, which must include independent and service-based projects done outside of school. In 12th grade, they must successfully defend the portfolio's contents to a faculty committee in order to complete the program and graduate with a CAP Diploma.

== Athletics ==
The student athletics program offers 23 varsity and 8 junior varsity sports, with a total of 42 teams:

=== Fall ===
- Football*
- Girls Field Hockey*
- Boys Soccer*
- Girls Soccer*
- Girls Volleyball*
- Golf
- Cross Country*
- Pickleball
- Poms
- Cheerleading

=== Winter ===
- Boys Basketball*
- Girls Basketball*
- Swimming and Diving
- Ice Hockey^
- Wrestling
- Indoor Track
- Cheerleading
- Bocce

=== Spring ===
- Boys Baseball*
- Girls Softball*
- Boys Lacrosse*
- Girls Lacrosse*
- Track and Field
- Boys Volleyball
- Co-ed Volleyball
- Boys Tennis
- Girls Tennis
- Gymnastics
- Coed Softball

=== Year-round ===
- Badminton^
- Ultimate Frisbee^
- Rowing^
- * indicates a sport for which there is also a junior varsity team.
- ^ indicates a sport that is not officially sanctioned by the school and is thus considered a club team.

=== Rivalries ===
Blair's biggest sports rivalry is with Northwood High School, another Downcounty Consortium school. Games between the schools are often dubbed "Battle of the Boulevard" because both sit on University Boulevard.

== Student activities and traditions ==
MBHS has more than 95 teams or clubs, some of which are entirely student-run, including the "Blazer Pride" Marching Band, Debate Team, Jewish Culture Club, and Philosophy Club. Popular activities include: Computer Team, Envirothon, Science Bowl, Ocean Science Bowl, and Youth and Government.

=== Publications ===
MBHS has several student news publications: Silver Chips, a self-funded print newspaper and 2009 NSPA Pacemaker winner and finalist in 2009, 2011, 2012, and 2024 and a CSPA Gold Crown winner in 2008, 2009, 2010, and 2018 and a Silver Crown winner in 2006, 2007, 2014, 2017, 2022, and 2026; Silver Chips Online, an online publication that received the National Scholastic Press Association Online Pacemaker Award in 2004, 2005, and 2006; and Blair Network Communications, which publishes InfoFlow, a daily broadcast news production.

Blair also publishes Silverlogue, its annual yearbook; Silver Quill, a literary arts magazine whose annual issue is distributed at the end of the year; SilverQuest, the annual Magnet magazine, and the Silver Splinter, a satirical website.

=== Computer Team ===
The Montgomery Blair Computer Team (MBCT) was founded in 2017 and is still active as of 2026. It specializes in advanced computer science topics beyond the classroom curriculum.

Topics have historically included algorithms and data structures, as well as programming techniques. They also include other miscellaneous theoretical computer science topics. MBCT participated in the University of Pennsylvania Programming Contest, Loyola Programming Contest, University of Maryland Programming Contest, and the United States of America Computing Olympiad (USACO). MBCT won the ACSL All-Star Competition Senior Division in 1991, 1993, 2001, 2003, 2009, 2011 and 2013.

=== Robotics team ===
MBHS is home to FIRST Robotics Competition Team 449, nicknamed "The Blair Robot Project" after the film The Blair Witch Project. Founded in 2000, it has competed every year since except 2005. The team has qualified for the FIRST Championship in 2000, 2003, 2004, 2017, 2019, 2023, 2024, 2025, and 2026.

=== Puzzlepalooza ===
MBHS hosts Puzzlepalooza, a puzzle tournament, each May since 2010 (except the COVID-19 pandemic years of 2020 and 2021). Over four days, teams have 12 hours to complete multiple-leveled puzzles to find a phrase that figures in the final puzzle.

=== Quiz bowl ===
MBHS' quiz bowl team competes in the local It's Academic competition. It won the Washington D.C. It's Academic in 1995, 2009, 2017, 2018, 2019, and 2026 and has participated several times in the High School National Championship Tournament and the National Scholastic Championship.

=== Science bowl ===
MBHS has a science bowl team that consistently places well in the Maryland Science Bowl. It won the National Science Bowl in 1999, 2016, and 2025; and the National Ocean Sciences Bowl in 2018.

=== History bowl ===
The Montgomery Blair History Bowl team won the National History Bowl Junior Varsity Championship in 2020 and the Philadelphia Championships in 2023.

== Notable alumni ==
=== Academics ===
- Maneesh Agrawala, computer science professor at Stanford University and MacArthur Fellowship recipient
- Tina Alster, dermatologist and founder of Washington Institute of Dermatologic Laser Surgery
- Malcolm Beasley, applied physics professor at Stanford University and former American Physical Society president
- Alexander Berg, computer science associate professor at the University of California, Irvine and computer vision researcher at Meta AI
- Jonah Berger, author and marketing professor at the Wharton School of the University of Pennsylvania
- Lorrie Cranor, computer science professor at Carnegie Mellon University and former chief technologist at the Federal Trade Commission
- Samit Dasgupta, mathematics professor at Duke University
- Jean Fan, biomedical engineering professor at Johns Hopkins University, winner of Presidential Early Career Award
- David Hu, engineering professor at Georgia Tech
- Jacob Lurie, mathematics professor at Princeton University, winner of MacArthur Fellowship and Breakthrough Prize in Mathematics
- Stephen Vladeck, law professor at Georgetown University
- Joshua Weitz, biology professor at the University of Maryland and American Association for the Advancement of Science fellow

=== Arts and entertainment ===
- Cynthia Addai-Robinson, television actress
- Tyrone Giordano, film and stage actor
- Goldie Hawn, Oscar-winning actress
- Ron Holloway, jazz saxophonist
- Eric Hutchinson, singer-songwriter
- Rosamond S. King, poet and literary theorist
- Joshua Oppenheimer (finished high school in New Mexico), filmmaker
- Chuck Redd, jazz percussionist
- Nora Roberts, romance novelist
- Sylvester Stallone, American actor, screenwriter, and film director (attended briefly before moving to Philadelphia)
- Ben Stein, economist, actor, commentator, and White House speechwriter to U.S. President Richard Nixon
- Rebecca Sugar (traveled to Albert Einstein High School for Visual Art Center Program), artist, composer, and director
- Lisa Ann Walter, actress and comedian

=== Athletics ===
- Steve Barber, former professional baseball player
- Tom Brown, former baseball player for the Washington Senators and former football player for the Green Bay Packers and Washington Redskins
- Keanu Carver, professional wrestler in WWE, signed under the NXT Brand
- Dominique Dawes (finished high school in Gaithersburg), former Olympic gymnast
- Steve Francis (completed GED), former professional basketball player
- Kelli Hill, former USA Women's Gymnastics Teams coach
- Wei-Hwa Huang, four-time World Puzzle Champion
- Sonny Jackson, former professional baseball player, an early athlete of color at Blair
- Johnny Klippstein, former professional baseball player and 1959 World Series champion with the Los Angeles Dodgers
- Jake Rozhansky, professional soccer player
- Visanthe Shiancoe, former professional football player
- Charlene Thomas-Swinson, professional basketball player
- Willis Wilson, former college basketball head coach
- Bob Windsor, former professional football player, New England Patriots and San Francisco 49ers
- David Vanterpool, former professional basketball player and assistant coach
- Morgan Wootten, head basketball coach at DeMatha Catholic High School with five national championships as a head coach

=== Business ===
- Matías Duarte, Google executive
- Jacqueline Hinman, former CEO of CH2M
- Shervin Pishevar, entrepreneur, venture capitalist, and co-founder of HyperOffice and Hyperloop One
- Chris T. Sullivan, co-founder of Outback Steakhouse

=== Journalism and media ===
- Erik Agard, crossword puzzle editor at USA Today
- Carl Bernstein, journalist and author who uncovered the Watergate scandal for The Washington Post
- Kiran Chetry, former television news anchor at Fox News and CNN
- Connie Chung, journalist and former television news anchor, CBS Evening News
- Jon Fortt, CNBC anchor
- Emily Gould, author and former co-editor of Gawker
- Rick Leventhal, former senior correspondent at Fox News Channel
- Tom Marr, former Baltimore Orioles radio broadcaster and WCBM radio host
- Donna Richardson, fitness and aerobics instructor, author, and ESPN commentator
- Inga Rundvold, former broadcast reporter at WRC-TV
- Eric Shansby, cartoonist at The Washington Post
- Daniel Zwerdling, former journalist at NPR

=== Politics and public service ===
- Tyras S. Athey, former member of the Maryland House of Delegates and Secretary of State of Maryland
- William A. Bronrott, former member of the Maryland House of Delegates
- Robin Ficker, former member of the Maryland House of Delegates
- Stan Greenberg, Democratic Party pollster and political strategist for Bill Clinton
- Adam Jentleson, U.S. Senate staffer for Harry Reid and John Fetterman
- Beverly Mackereth, former member of the Pennsylvania House of Representatives and Secretary of the Pennsylvania Department of Public Welfare
- J. Thomas Manger, chief of the United States Capitol Police
- Bernice Mireku-North, member of the Maryland House of Delegates
- Thomas R. Norris, U.S. Navy SEAL and Medal of Honor recipient for his actions during the Vietnam War
- William Addams Reitwiesner, genealogist and Library of Congress employee
- Craig L. Rice, former Montgomery County Councilmember and member of the Maryland House of Delegates
- Jeff Waldstreicher, member of the Maryland Senate
- Christopher Williams, NASA astronaut
