= Emily Fairfax =

American ecohydrologist

Academic background
- Education: Carleton College (BA); University of Colorado, Boulder (PhD)
- Website: Official website

Emily Fairfax is an American ecohydrologist and associate professor of geography at the University of Minnesota. She studies how beavers create drought- and wildfire-resistant patches in riparian landscapes. Her work as an environmental scholar has received international media attention, informed land management policy in the western United States, and provided the scientific basis for the Pixar animated film Hoppers (2026).

== Education and career ==
Fairfax dual majored in Chemistry and Physics at Carleton College, then earned her Ph.D. in Geology from the University of Colorado Boulder in 2019. Her doctoral studies were funded by a DoD NDSEG Fellowship, and she completed graduate certificates in Hydrologic Sciences and in College Teaching. She has cited her experience as a Girl Scout and leading canoe trips in the Boundary Waters Canoe Area as formative influences on her interest in wetland ecology.

Fairfax was an assistant professor of Environmental Science and Resource Management at California State University Channel Islands from 2019 to 2023. She joined the University of Minnesota in 2023 as an assistant professor of Physical Geography, where she is affiliated with the Saint Anthony Falls Laboratory.

In 2024, Fairfax was selected as an Environment Fellow by the Walton Family Foundation and received the G.K. Gilbert Award for Excellence in Geomorphological Research from the American Association of Geographers. In 2025, she was awarded a McKnight Land-Grant Professorship at the University of Minnesota.

== Research ==
Fairfax studies how ecosystem engineering by beavers affects the drought and fire resistance of wetland and riparian ecosystems in North America, using remote sensing, modeling, and field work. Her 2020 study "Smokey the Beaver," coauthored with Andrew Whittle, was the first peer-reviewed study to document beaver-created fire refugia.

In 2023, Fairfax and collaborators at Google published EEAGER (Earth Engine Automated Geospatial Element(s) Recognition), a machine learning model for identifying beaver dams in satellite and aerial imagery.

== Public and policy impact ==
Fairfax's research has drawn wide public attention for demonstrating that beaver activity can protect landscapes from wildfire and drought. Her "Smokey the Beaver" study received coverage in National Geographic, the BBC, NPR, the New York Times, and Scientific American.

She has testified before the Oregon State Legislature on beaver-driven climate resilience, and her studies are cited in reports by the United Nations Environment Programme and the Colorado Department of Transportation.

=== Hoppers ===
Fairfax served as the primary science consultant for the Pixar animated film Hoppers (2026), providing scientific guidance from 2021 through the film's release and accompanying the art team to field research sites in Colorado and Wyoming. A character in the film, Dr. Samantha E. Fairfax, was named after her.
