= National Center for Earth-surface Dynamics =

National Center for Earth-surface Dynamics (NCED)
- Type: National Science Foundation Science and Technology Center
- Established: 2002
- Director: Efi Foufoula-Georgiou
- Location: Minneapolis and Saint Paul, Minnesota
- Website: www.umn.edu

The National Center for Earth-surface Dynamics, or NCED, is an NSF Science and Technology Center- a collaborative partnership among educational, research, and public/private entities that aims to create new knowledge of significant benefit to society. Its mission is to understand the dynamics of the coupled processes that shape the Earth’s surface—physical, biological, geochemical, and anthropogenic—and how they will respond to climate, land use, and management change. NCED is headquartered at the University of Minnesota's Saint Anthony Falls Laboratory.

== Research ==
NCED is building interdisciplinary Earth-surface science by integrating elements of geomorphology, ecology, hydrology, sedimentary geology, engineering, economics, and geochemistry. It is creating a predictive Earth-surface science by integrating the advances and approaches of theory, laboratory experiments, numerical modeling, and fieldwork

NCED research is unified by a focus on channel networks and their surroundings. The center's three research initiatives (“Integrated Programs”) approach channel networks from a source-to-sink perspective, looking at watersheds (Watersheds), individual stream reaches (Streams), and depositional systems (Deltas).

In the Watersheds Integrated Program, NCED researchers work to develop quantitative expressions for the fundamental geomorphic and biological processes involved in landscape evolution, and combine that knowledge with digital topographic data to predict the locations of landslide hazards, large algal blooms, or other properties of interest. NCED Watersheds research seeks to build watershed-scale numerical models of real landscapes to explore problems of long time-scale controls on landscape evolution and short time-scale responses of aquatic ecosystems to land-use change.

NCED Streams research works to move the practice of stream restoration beyond analogy and experiential anecdote toward multidisciplinary quantitative prediction. The Streams research program involves biologists, civil engineers, ecologists, geochemists, geologists, hydrologists, and economists in a concerted effort to develop practical, predictive models of river systems that can guide stream and watershed restoration practice.

NCED Deltas research seeks to understand the processes of delta dynamics to inform the present-day restoration of the Mississippi River Delta. Research in this program uses the subsurface stratigraphy of modern deltas to infer rates, spatial patterns, and mechanisms of natural (pre-human) delta building processes. Simultaneously, researchers at the center perform experiments and field studies to develop predictive models of the processes by which deltas build land and maintain themselves and their associated ecosystems against subsidence and sea-level rise.

== Institutions ==
Institutions that are home to NCED principal investigators who participate directly with NCED include:

- Fond du Lac Tribal and Community College,
- Johns Hopkins University,
- Science Museum of Minnesota,
- Southern Illinois University Carbondale,
- University of California-Berkeley,
- University of Colorado at Boulder,
- University of Illinois at Urbana-Champaign,
- Louisiana State University,
- University of Texas at Austin,
- St. Anthony Falls Laboratory, and
- University of Minnesota.

== See also ==
- International trade and water
- Wax Lake
