= Selesnick =

Selesnick is a surname. Notable people with the surname include:

- Ivan Selesnick, American engineer
- Richard Selesnick (born 1964), American artist, one half of Kahn & Selesnick
