= Jacqueline Hinman =

American businesswoman (born 1961)

Jacqueline A. Hinman
- Born: Jacqueline Anne Crenca; 1961 (age 64–65); Maryland, United States
- Education: Montgomery Blair High School, Pennsylvania State University
- Occupation: Business executive
- Employer(s): Boardmember of Several Organizations; CH2M (Former Chairman, president and CEO)
- Family: George (husband)

Jacqueline "Jacque" Crenca Hinman (nee Crenca) is one of a small number of women who have led Fortune 500 companies including as the chairman, president and CEO of CH2M.

== Early life and education ==
Hinman received her bachelor's degree in civil/environmental engineering from Pennsylvania State University College of Engineering in 1983. She also attended the Stanford Executive Program in 2013. She is a registered professional engineer (P.E.) with accreditation under the US Green Building Council’s Leadership in Energy and Environmental Design (LEED) program.

== Career ==
Hinman is the CEO of Atlas Technical Consultants, a professional testing, inspection, engineering, construction management firm that serves the infrastructure and environmental markets. She joined the company in January 2024 and was recruited by the firm's private equity owner, GI Partners to increase the company's value through growth, distinctive client service, efficient operations, and a reputation as a preferred employer.

From 2018 to 2023, she was an operating advisor to 3 major private equity firms with a focus on acquisitions, portfolio company oversight, and board representation. Her industry focus included companies in the engineering, construction management, energy, infrastructure, and environmental sectors.

=== Pre-CEO Career ===
In 1988, Hinman joined CH2M in the environmental business. She worked for ten years doing design management, project management, construction management, business development, and operations management. In 1997 she became the CEO of management consulting firm Talisman Partners, which was acquired by the Infrastructure Division of Tyco in 2001. From 2001 until 2004 Hinman was senior vice president of Tyco's Facilities and Infrastructure Business (formerly Earth Tech). She owned the Azimuth Group from 2004 to 2005, as a senior management consultant for the construction and engineering industry.

After returning to CH2M, Hinman was appointed to the board of CH2M on May 6, 2008. She had multiple Executive Roles for the company, including as President of the Facilities and Infrastructure Division, President of the Center for Project Excellence, and Senior VP of Global Business Development. Hinman was especially instrumental in developing the firm's sport program management business, capitalizing on its historic involvement in the sustainability aspects of the Olympic Games (Atlanta, Sydney, Salt Lake City, Vancouver) and expanding the company's work into infrastructure and overall sport program management for the London and Rio Olympics. During this time, CH2M won major programs such as the Panama Canal Expansion and the MASDAR UAE Sustainable City. Beginning in 2011 Hinman was President of the International Division of CH2M, and oversaw the acquisition of UK-based Halcrow Group, for which she was chairman and CEO until its integration.

=== CEO of CH2M ===
Hinman took over as president and CEO in January 2014. In July 2014 the company announced the appointment of Hinman to be the chairman of the board replacing Lee McIntire who had retired from that position on September 18, 2014.

According to The Denver Post-Business in October 2013, her position was noteworthy, as engineering had traditionally been a field in which men have dominated. According to Mark Leftly of the UK's The Independent in September 2013, since her rise to the head of CH2M she is “one of the most powerful women in the industry.”

Hinman promoted diversity and inclusion during her tenure as chairman and CEO, and CH2M HILL earned a 2020 Women on Boards recognition for board composition of 30% women. Hinman has been a noted reference on improving corporate cultures.

During this time, CH2M was named by Fortune Magazine as one of the "Top 50 Companies Changing the World" and as a Forbes "Best Employer for Diversity" and "Best Large Employer". It was also named as a "World's Most Ethical Company" by Ethisphere for a ninth consecutive year.

Hinman's tenure as CEO also saw the company shift away from fixed price Engineer-Procure-Construct (EPC) contracts. Years earlier, the company had entered the at-risk construction industry and taken on several EPC projects that proved difficult to perform and strained the balance sheet starting in late 2013. These challenges and the company's lagging growth in its core engineering and consulting business also prompted the CH2M board to evaluate the company's capital structure in 2014. In 2015, CH2M modified its historical employee ownership model by bringing on private equity firm Apollo Global Management in 2015 as a minority investor. During the period 2015–2017, CH2M improved its performance and shifted its operating model. Facing a growing retired employee shareholder base, the CH2M board actively evaluated capital structure change options in 2017 in order to provide sufficient capital to shareholders that desired to sell their stock. After preparing for an IPO, and evaluating other merger and sales options, CH2M agreed to merge with Jacobs Solutions in August 2017. Hinman retired from CH2M concurrent with the completion of the December 2017 merger.

=== Board memberships ===
In November 2017, Hinman joined the board of International Paper, and has been on each of its committees. She chairs the Management Development and Compensation Committee and is on the Governance Committee. In April 2019, Hinman was named a Director of the newly formed Dow, after having been on the board of DowDuPont since June 2018. Hinman has been on each of Dow's board committees and is on the Environmental, Health, Safety and Technology Committee and the Compensation and Governance Committee. In December 2019, Hinman joined the board of AECOM, on its Strategy, Risk and Safety Committee and its Compensation Committee. She ended her AECOM board work on March 1, 2022. Hinman also previously was on the board executive committee of the nonprofit organization Catalyst

Hinman is a director of Atlas Technical Consultants and of the nonprofit Wolf Trap Foundation for the Performing Arts.

== See also ==
- List of women CEOs of Fortune 500 companies
