= Efi Foufoula-Georgiou =

Greek-American academic

- Born: 1957 (age 68–69); Levadia, Greece
- Awards: Dalton Medal (European Geophysical Union), Hydrologic Sciences Award (American Geophysical Union), Horton Lecturer in Hydrology (American Meteorological Society)
- Scientific career
- Workplaces: University of Minnesota, University of California, Irvine
- Website: http://efi.eng.uci.edu/

Efi Foufoula-Georgiou (born 1957) is a Distinguished Professor in the Civil and Environmental Engineering department at the University of California, Irvine. She is well known for her research on the applications of wavelet analysis in the fields of hydrology and geophysics and her many contributions to academic journals and national committees.

== Background and education ==
Foufoula-Georgiou was born in Livadeia, Greece in 1957, and received a diploma in Civil Engineering from the National Technical University of Athens. She received her M.S. in Environmental Engineering in 1982 from the University of Florida, and a Ph.D. in Environmental Engineering from the University of Florida in 1985.

== Career and research ==
She began her career in academia as an assistant professor at Iowa State University (from 1986 to 1989). She then moved to the University of Minnesota, where she was an associate professor before earning a position as a full Professor. She later became the director of the Saint Anthony Falls Laboratory. She is now a Professor Emerita at the University of Minnesota. She accepted a position at the University of California, Irvine in 2016, where she currently resides. She is a distinguished professor at the university and holds the Henry Samueli Endowed Chair in Engineering. She is also the Associate Dean for Research and Innovation.

Foufoula-Georgiou is best known for her research within the field of Environmental Engineering, including her work with wavelet analysis and its applications in Geophysics. She is also a member of multiple national committees, including the NASA Earth Sciences Subcommittee and the US Nuclear Waste and Technical Review Board.

== Awards ==
- In 2002, she received the John Dalton Medal of the European Geophysical Society.
- In 2007, she was awarded the Hydrologic Sciences Award of the American Geophysical Union.
- In 2016 she was chosen as the Robert E. Horton Lecturer in Hydrology by the American Meteorological Society
- In 2018 Foufoula-Georgiou was elected to the National Academy of Engineering for "For contributions to hydrology and hydroclimatology with applications to engineered systems across scales."
- In 2019, Dr. Foufoula-Georgiou was awarded the American Geophysical Union Hydrology Section Walter B. Langbein Lecture for lifetime contributions to the science of hydrology and/or for unselfish cooperation in hydrologic research.
- in 2026 elected an International Fellow of the Royal Academy of Engineering..

== Publications ==
- “Wavelet Analysis in Geophysics”, 1994, Academic Press Inc.
- “Toward a unified science of the Earth's surface: Opportunities for synthesis among hydrology, geomorphology, geochemistry, and ecology,” 2006, American Geophysical Union
- “A Markov Renewal Model for Rainfall Occurrences”, 1987, American Geophysical Union
- “Gradient Dynamic Programming for Stochastic Optimal Control of Multidimensional Water Resources Systems”, 1988, American Geophysical Union
- “A nonlocal theory of sediment transport on hillslopes”, 2010, Journal of Geophysical Research
- “Recent advances in rainfall modeling, estimation, and forecasting”, 1995, American Geophysical Union
