= Jean Fan =

American biomedical engineer

Jean Fan is an American Biomedical Engineer who emigrated from China. She is known for her research in molecular biology in regards to cancer. In addition, throughout her life she has facilitated young girls to pursue a career in science.

== Early life and education ==
Jean Fan was born in Wuhan, China, where she lived with her grandparents for half a year due to her parents' busy work schedules in the city. Her mother was working with the Chinese Meteorology Administration (CMA) when she was born and studying meteorology. She and her dad then moved to the U.S. when she was six where they lived in a small apartment shared with one other family. Her family moved so that their daughter would have more opportunities than in China. Being a working-class family caused money to be tight in her household. Every dollar had to be accounted for and tough purchasing decisions had to be made. Despite this, her mother went on to pursue a Ph.D. at the University of Maryland. She was an inspiration to Fan and was one of the reasons she pursued a career in science.

In the U.S. from August 2005 to May 2009, she went to Montgomery Blair High School and was a part of the magnet program where she received her high school diploma. At the end of high school, she interned at the NIH where she researched BRF2 in breast cancer. Her lab partner, Vonnie inspired her to pursue a career in science and mentor young girls. Following this, she attended Johns Hopkins University from August 2009 to May 2013 where she received a Bachelor of Science in Biomedical Engineering and Applied Mathematics. While pursuing the sciences, she continued to be creative through photography. She created JFotography which is her own personal website where she can share her collection of images and tutorials on how to take the best picture, edit the picture, and more. From June 2013 to January 2018 she received her Ph.D. in Bioinformatics and Integrative Genomics from Harvard University. Finally, from March 2018 to June 2020 she completed her post-doctoral fellowship at Harvard University where she analyzed internal and external cellular processes.

== Career ==
In 2014, Jean Fan became the founder and director of cuSTEMized which allows for custom-made picture books for girls interested in the science field. Fan had always been one of the few women in her science classes, so she wanted to inspire young girls to pursue the sciences. From September 2015 to June 2017 while getting her doctorate, Fan taught a course named "Computer Science without Intimidation." Her first position which she holds to this day is as an assistant professor in the Department of Biomedical Engineering at Johns Hopkins University which she started in July 2020. She teaches two courses at Johns Hopkins University which seek to understand at the DNA level the human genome. In addition to teaching, she is a part of a research team called the JEFworks lab which works to understand the role of cellular processes and their effect on cancer progression. Her research team has developed several bioinformatic software to enhance understanding of data collection. For example, they created Honey/BADGER which can detect changes from single cell RNA data. In addition to research, Fan has her own YouTube channel where she shares research and science-based talks to a wide range of people.

== Selected publications ==
1. Jain, Sanjay; Pei, Liming; Spraggins, Jeffrey M.; et al. (August 2023). "Advances and prospects for the Human BioMolecular Atlas Program (HuBMAP)". Nature Cell Biology. 25 (8): 1089–1100. doi:10.1038/s41556-023-01194-w. PMC 10681365. PMID 37468756.
2. Purroy, Noelia; Tong, Yuzhou Evelyn; Lemvigh, Camilla K.; et al. (7 April 2022). "Single-cell analysis reveals immune dysfunction from the earliest stages of CLL that can be reversed by ibrutinib". Blood. 139 (14): 2252–2256. doi:10.1182/blood.2021013926. PMC 8990375. PMID 35020831.
3. Hara, Toshiro; Chanoch-Myers, Rony; Mathewson, Nathan D.; et al. (June 2021). "Interactions between cancer cells and immune cells drive transitions to mesenchymal-like states in glioblastoma". Cancer Cell. 39 (6): 779–792.e11. doi:10.1016/j.ccell.2021.05.002. PMC 8366750. PMID 34087162.

== Awards and honors ==
In 2019 she received the Nature Research Award for Inspiring Science. This is awarded to people who inspire young girls to pursue a career in the science field. In 2020, Fan was named on the Forbes 30 Under 30 list. This list recognizes 30 exceptional leaders, scientists, entrepreneurs, etc. under 30 years old. In 2021, Fan received the NSF Early CAREER Award which recognizes people who have a bright future ahead in contributing to the science world. She was recognized through her extensive research in cellular processes with a focus on cancer. In 2025, Fan received the Presidential Early Career Award for Scientists and Engineers
