= Inga Rundvold =

US broadcast reporter, TV host, and model (1920–2004)

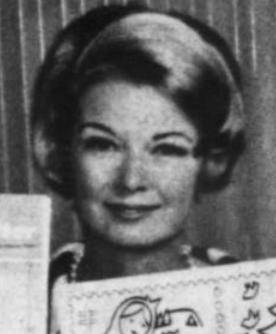
- Rundvold in 1965
- Born: Inga Elizabeth Rundvold; July 3, 1920; Stryn, Norway
- Died: February 4, 2004 (aged 83); Richmond, Virginia, US
- Occupations: Broadcaster, writer

Inga Elizabeth Rundvold (July 3, 1920 – February 4, 2004) was a broadcast reporter and host and one of Washington D.C's first on-air media personalities in the 1950s and 1960s. She is sometime referred to as "DC's First Lady of Television". Rundvold is best known for her television programs Inga's Angle and Let's Go Places on WNBW-TV.

== Early life and education ==
Born in Stryn, Norway, Rundvold was one of at least three children born to Thomas Rundvold and Malene Nesheim. Still an infant when her family relocated to the United States, Rundvold spent her formative years in Takoma Park, Maryland, a suburb of Washington, D.C. After graduating from Montgomery Blair High School, she attended the Washington School of Fashion Modeling.

== Career ==
Remaining in Washington, (Note: Although the Washington Post obituary states that Rundvold moved to New York after completing her education, no such move is confirmed by contemporaneous reports, all of which indicate that she continued to work and reside within the greater Washington metropolitan area.) Rundvold worked as a model until her marriage in 1943, at which point she disappeared from public view for more than three years. Resurfacing in 1946, she soon transitioned to writing about fashion for the Washington Times-Herald, and by March 1947, Rundvold had become the paper's fashion editor.

In 1951, she began hosting, writing, and producing her own show, Inga's Angle (later changed to Today with Inga) which ran for 16 years, the longest running early program of that time. She interviewed many famous people including John F. Kennedy, Bette Davis, Lyndon B. Johnson, Hubert H. Humphrey, Milton Berle, Gregory Peck, Charlton Heston, Kim Novak, and Arthur Schlesinger among others. Her on-air persona was warm yet glamorous and she was known for deftly switching quickly from one conversation topic to the next. Besides interviewing political and celebrity guests, the show also had beauty, exercise, and commercial product segments.

Rundvold retired from her show in 1967 and focused her career on travel writing. She produced Let's Go Places a 30-minute show about foreign travel, and freelanced for the New York Daily News, Chicago Tribune, Los Angeles Times, and others. She also helped create the Around the World Venture, an organization promoting U.S. tourism to foreign press and travel offices. In addition, she worked with the American Revolution Bicentennial Commission and the National Trust for Historic Preservation, and was an active member of the Women's National Press Club,

== Personal life and death ==
Rundvold was married to her first husband, Lester J. Hook, from 1943 until his death in 1981, and to her second, John J. Kuhn, from 1984 until his death in 1997. She had one child by the first marriage, a daughter.

Rundvold died from complications of a stroke on February 4, 2004, in Richmond, Virginia, survived by her daughter, a sister and three grandchildren.

== In popular culture ==
In the early 1960's, Rundvold hosted a show on WRC-TV called "TV Beauty School." This was regarded by NBC's David Brinkley - based at WRC - as "a remarkably silly fashion show." When news of President John F. Kennedy's shooting reached Brinkley by wire shortly after 1:30, the manager of WRC was out to lunch and no one at the station "knew where he was or would assume responsibility for bouncing the models" from live television. Brinkley could not get on the air at the station or the network nationally for some time. One highly regarded historian of the Kennedy assassination described this as the hour of Brinkley's "'private ordeal'. . . 'With every teletype hammering out history, the monitor in his office continued to present a fashion show.'" Don Pardo's first network bulletin finally broke in to WRC and all network stations at 1:46 and NBC preempted all affiliates with news of the assassination beginning at 1:53. When Brinkley himself finally got on the air shortly after 2:15 PM, he was in a state of what another NBC newscaster described as a state of "controlled panic."
