= CH2M =

1946–2017 American global engineering company

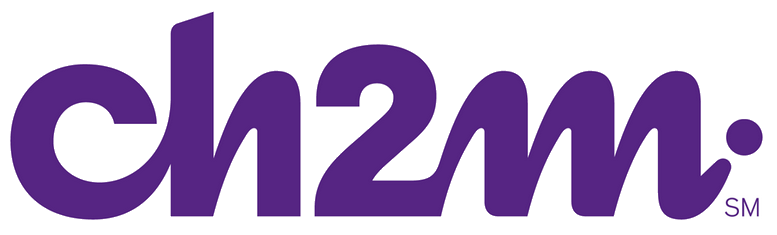
- Type: Environmental Engineering
- Industry: Engineering
- Founded: 1946; 80 years ago in Corvallis, Oregon as Cornell, Howland, Hayes, and Merryfield
- Defunct: December 18, 2017
- Fate: Acquired by Jacobs Engineering Group
- Headquarters: Englewood, Colorado
- Key people: Jacqueline Hinman (president & CEO); Gary L. McArthur (CFO)
- Revenue: ▼US$5.24 billion (2016)
- Net income: ▲US$139.2 million (2016)
- Total assets: ▼US$2.67 billion (2016)
- Total equity: ▲US$546.7 million (2016)
- Number of employees: 20,000 (2016)

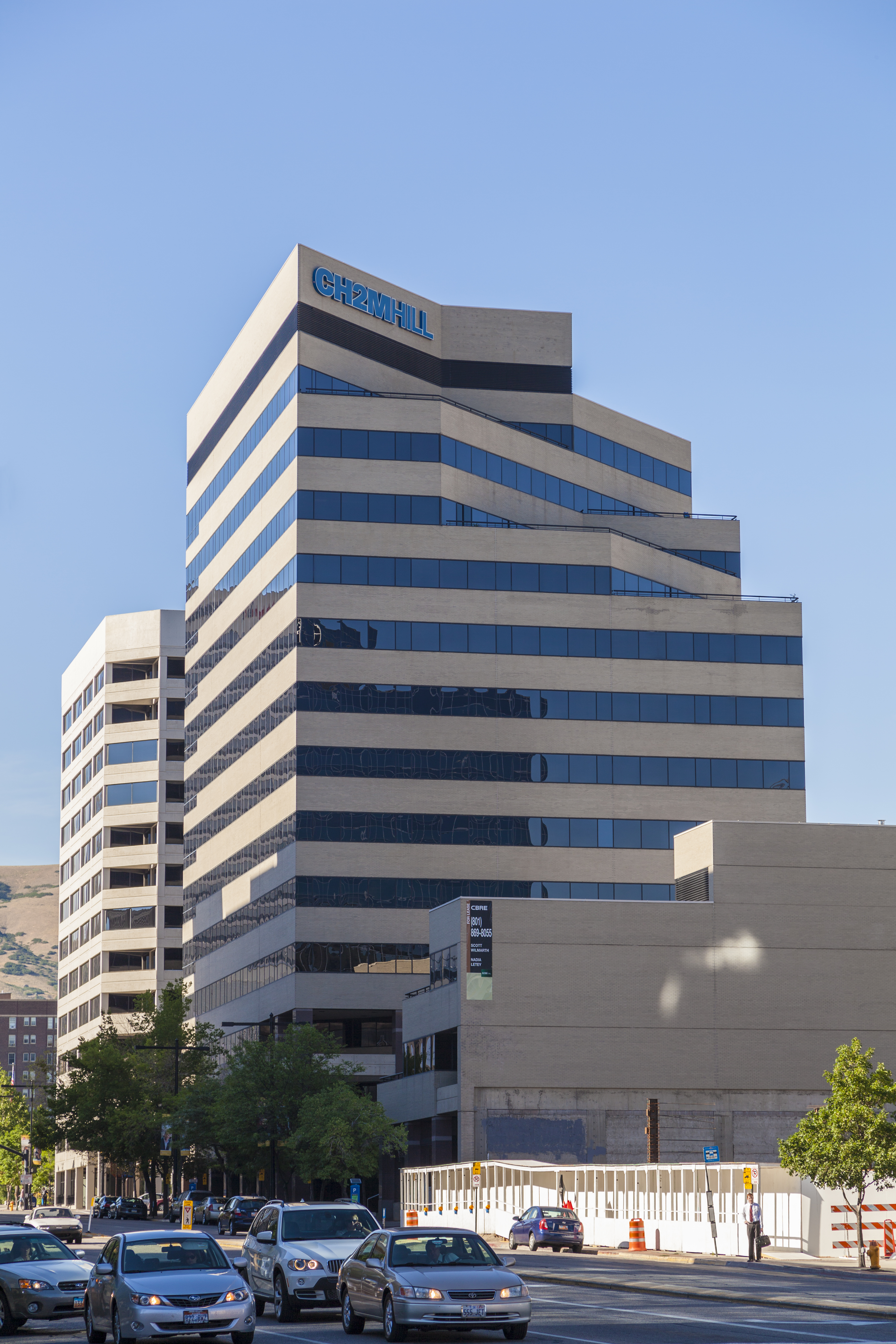
CH2M Hill offices at the Parkside Tower in Salt Lake City, Utah (2013)

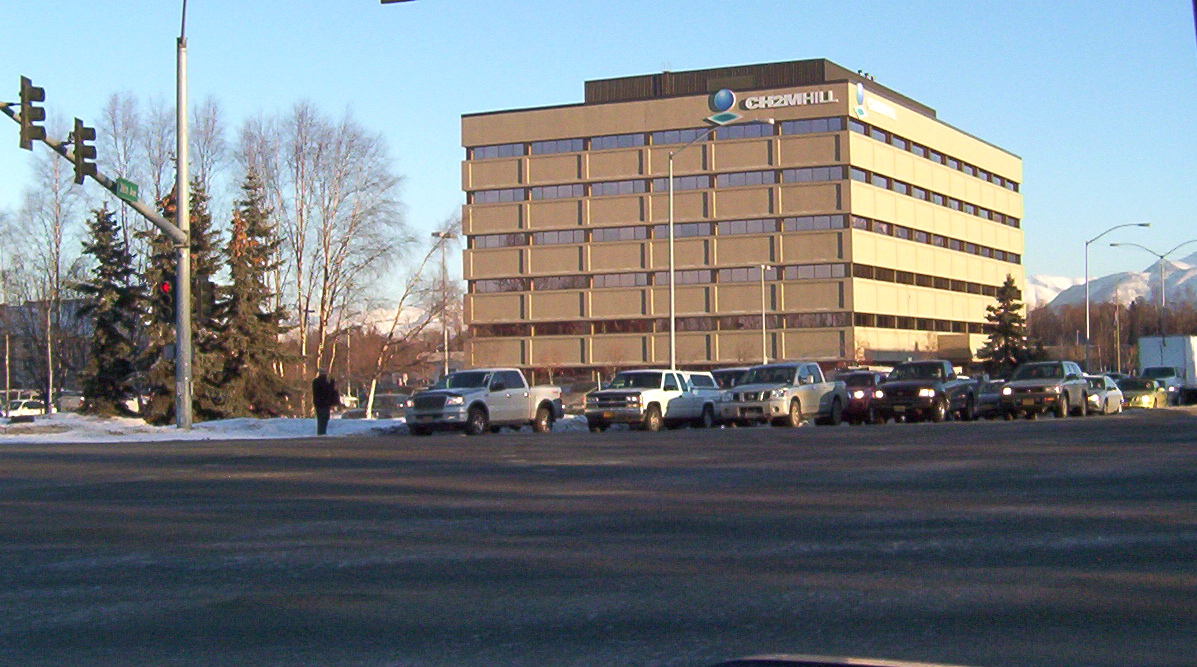
The former VECO building, now CH2M Hill's Alaska headquarters (2011)

CH2M, earlier CH2M HILL, Inc., was an American engineering company that provided consulting, design, construction, and operations services for corporations and governments. The company was organized in Corvallis, Oregon, and headquartered at 9191 South Jamaica Street, Englewood, Colorado. In December 2017, the company was acquired by Jacobs Engineering Group.

The company played a major role in the Panama Canal expansion project. The company developed, maintained and published its own method for managing projects for clients, called the CH2M HILL Project Delivery System. The firm was named from the initials of its four founders.

== History ==
CH2M was founded in 1946 in Corvallis, Oregon, by Oregon State University civil engineering professor Fred Merryfield and three of his students: Holly Cornell, James Howland and Thomas Burke Hayes. Cornell, Howland, and Hayes were all graduates of Oregon State University. The company became CH2M Hill after a merger with Clair A. Hill & Associates in 1971. The firm remained headquartered in Oregon until 1980, when it moved to Colorado.

=== Projects ===
In 2000, the company was part of a joint venture to replace the Singapore sanitary services infrastructure. The new Singapore Deep Tunnel System was designed to improve reliability, ease, and economy of operation, and to help Singapore handle the increasing use of its waterfront.

In October 2005, Kaiser Hill, a joint venture of CH2M Hill, decommissioned and closed a former nuclear weapons facility at the Rocky Flats Plant. In 2006, the company helped rebuilding efforts along the Gulf Coast of the United States after Hurricane Katrina.

In June 2007, along with General Electric, the company was selected to build a $660 million gas-fired power plant in Queensland, Australia. In April 2007, the company was selected for an $11.7 billion project to move American military bases in Korea.

In August 2007, the Panama Canal Authority selected the company to manage the $5.25 billion Panama Canal expansion project, which added new locks to the Pacific and Atlantic ends of the canal and enabled New Panamax ships to pass through the canal for the first time.

In April 2009, a consortium led by the company was named program partner to oversee construction of the Crossrail project to expand London's transit system. On August 30, 2006, along with partners Mace Group and Laing O'Rourke, the company was selected as a supplier for the London 2012 Olympics.

In June 2008, the United States Department of Energy selected a subsidiary of the company to manage the deconstruction and remediation of the Central Plateau on the Hanford Site in eastern Washington, one of the world's largest environmental cleanup projects, including shrinking the environmental footprint of the Hanford Site from 586-square-mile (1,520 km^{2}) to 75 square miles (190 km^{2}). In April 2019, the company was cited for safety violations at the project.

In March 2013, the company was selected by South Oil Company of Iraq to provide project management consultancy services for the Iraq Common Seawater Supply Project.

Engineering News-Record identified two projects that may have contributed to CH2M's being bought out in December 2017: A combined-cycle power project, part of the Ichthys gas field development, which had lost CH2M $140 million in 2014, and the addition of a toll lane in Austin, Texas, for the Central Texas Regional Mobility Authority, which had lost the company $121.3 million in 2014 due to delays caused by weather and staffing issues, among other things.

=== Acquisitions ===
In 1977, the company acquired Black, Crow & Eidsness, an engineering firm in the southeast United States. In August 2002, the company acquired Gee & Jensen, a Ports and Harbor firm based in Florida, DeMil International, a weapons destruction firm based in the United States, and EHS Consultants Ltd, a consulting firm based in Hong Kong.

In December 2003, Lockwood Greene Engineers was acquired. The sale was forced by the financial collapse of JA Jones Inc, its North American parent company and wholly owned subsidiary of the insolvent German construction conglomerate, Philipp Holzmann AG. CH2M picked up LGE's private-sector design portfolio.

In October 2005, it acquired BBS Corporation, an environmental engineering firm based in Ohio. In September 2007, the company acquired most of the components of VECO, an Alaska-based firm that specialized in services to the petroleum industry and had become embroiled in the Alaska political corruption probe.

In December 2007, the company acquired Trigon EPC. In March 2008, the company acquired Texas based Goldston Engineering, a company specialising in marine and coastal transportation engineering services.

In 2011, CH2M Hill acquired the transportation consulting unit of Booz Allen Hamilton.

In September 2011, CH2M Hill acquired the UK-based engineering consulting firm Halcrow Group. In October 2014, the company acquired TERA Environmental Consultants, an environmental consulting firm based in Canada that had worked with pipeline and powerline clients and oil and gas companies, for 30 years.

=== Other activities ===
In April 2015, the company removed the word "Hill" from its branding, and unveiled a new logo. In March 2017, the company renewed its lease at Honey Creek Corporate Center. In June 2017, the company reiterated its support for the Paris Agreement.

=== Acquisition by Jacobs Engineering Group ===
In December 2017, Jacobs Engineering Group acquired CH2M for US$3.3 billion in cash and stock.
