= Forrest N. Iandola =

American computer scientist

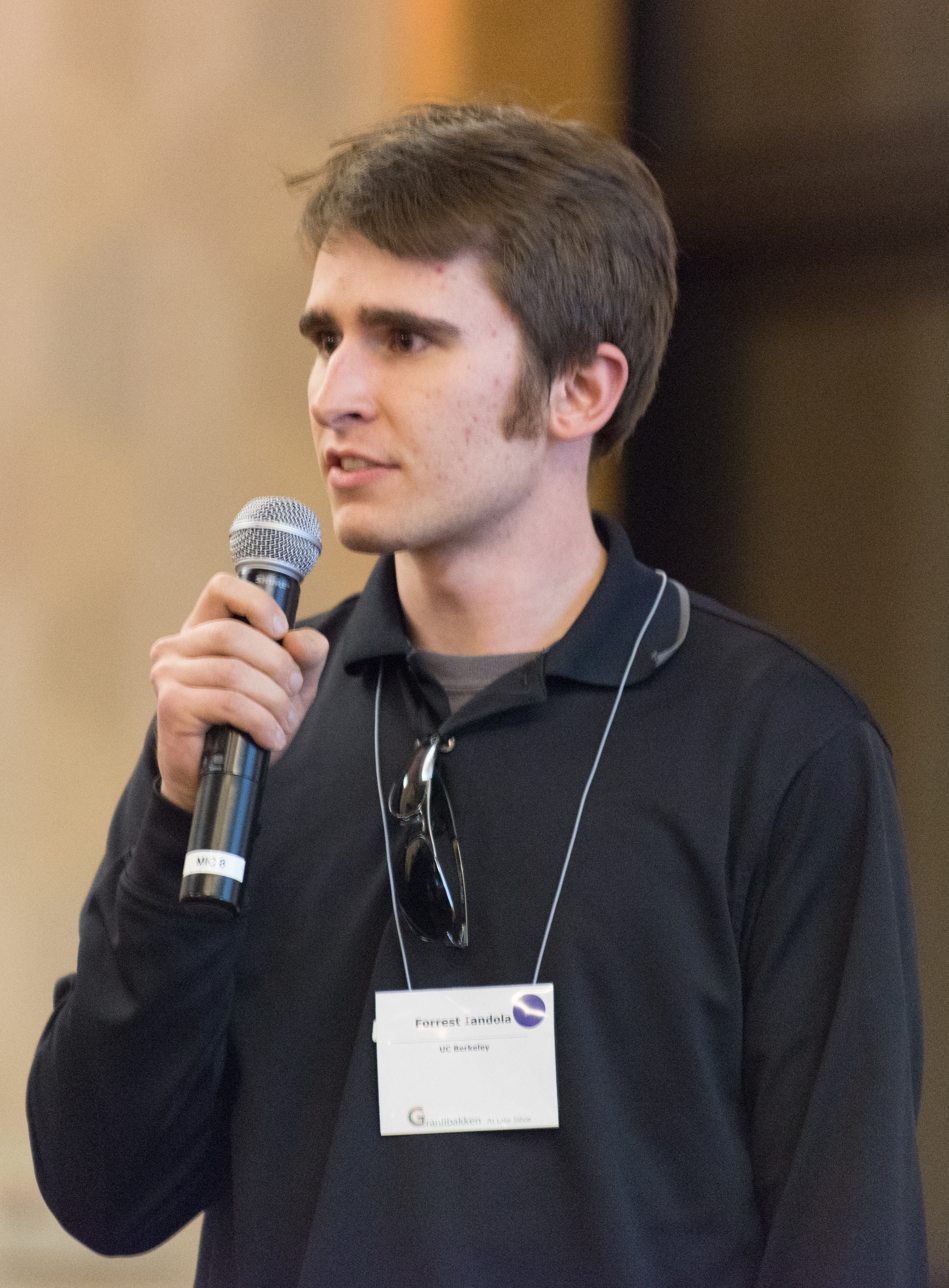
- Iandola in 2013
- Education: UC Berkeley
- Scientific career
- Fields: Computer science
- Workplaces: Tesla, Meta
- Website: https://www.forrestiandola.com/

Forrest N. Iandola is an American computer scientist specializing in efficient AI.

== Career ==
Iandola earned a PhD in Electrical Engineering and Computer Science from UC Berkeley in 2016, advised by Kurt Keutzer. As part of his dissertation, he co-authored SqueezeNet, a deep neural network for image classification optimized for smartphones and other mobile devices.

Iandola and Keutzer went on to co-found DeepScale. The firm squeezes deep neural networks onto low-cost automotive-grade processors for use in driver assistance systems. Tesla acquired DeepScale in 2019.

In 2020, he co-authored SqueezeBERT, an efficient neural network for natural language processing. In 2022, he joined Meta as an AI research scientist. His research at Meta includes developing efficient AI models, such as EfficientSAM and MobileLLM.
