= DeepScale =

American technology company

DeepScale, Inc.
- Founded: 2015; 11 years ago
- Founder: Forrest N. Iandola; Kurt Keutzer
- Defunct: October 1, 2019
- Fate: Acquired by Tesla, Inc.
- Headquarters: Mountain View, California, U.S
- Key people: Forrest N. Iandola (CEO)
- Website: deepscale.ai

DeepScale, Inc. was an American technology company headquartered in Mountain View, California, that developed perceptual system technologies for automated vehicles. On October 1, 2019, the company was acquired by Tesla, Inc.

== History ==
DeepScale was co-founded in 2015 by Forrest Iandola and Kurt Keutzer. In 2018, DeepScale raised US$15 million in Series A funding. In 2018, the firm announced strategic partnerships with automotive suppliers including Visteon and Hella Aglaia Mobile Vision GmbH. On October 1, 2019, the firm was purchased by Tesla, which works on autonomous vehicle technology.

== Technology ==
Prior to the founding of DeepScale, Forrest Iandola and Kurt Keutzer worked together at University of California, Berkeley, on making deep neural networks (DNNs) more efficient. In 2016, shortly after the founding of DeepScale, Iandola, Keutzer, and their collaborators released SqueezeNet, which is a small and energy-efficient DNN for computer vision. By developing smaller DNNs, the firm has been able to run deep learning on scaled-down processing hardware such as smartphones and automotive-grade chips. In 2018, the firm said that its engineering team had moved beyond SqueezeNet and that it had developed even faster and more accurate DNNs for use in commercial products.

=== Neural architecture search ===
In recent years, neural architecture search (NAS) has begun to outperform humans at designing DNNs that produce high-accuracy results while running fast. In 2019, DeepScale published a paper called SqueezeNAS, which used supernetwork-based NAS to design a family of fast and accurate DNNs for semantic segmentation of images. The paper claimed that the SqueezeNAS neural networks outperform the speed-accuracy tradeoff curve of Google's MobileNetV3 family of neural network models. While Google used thousands of GPU-days to search for the design of MobileNetV3, DeepScale used just tens of GPU-days to automatically design the DNNs presented in the SqueezeNAS paper.

== Product ==
The firm develops perceptual system software which uses deep neural networks to enable cars to interpret their environment. The software is designed for integration into an open platform, where a wide range of sensors and processors can be used. The software is able to run on a variety of processors, ranging from NVIDIA GPUs to smaller ARM-based processing chips that are designed specifically for the automotive market.

In January 2019, the firm launched an automotive perception software product called "Carver" that uses deep neural networks to perform object detection, lane identification, and drivable area identification. To accomplish this, Carver uses three neural networks which run in parallel. While running in real-time, these three networks perform a total of 0.6 trillion operations per second ("tera-ops/sec"). As a point of reference, each of the two redundant chips on the Tesla Full Self-Driving computer system board can perform 36 tera-ops/sec. So 0.6 tera-ops/sec is only 2% of the capacity of each Tesla chip.

== Acquisition by Tesla ==
On October 1, 2019, CNBC reported that Tesla had purchased DeepScale. Fortune stated that "it's apparent that DeepScale's technology will be integrated into Tesla's Autopilot, the self-driving technology the company is currently working on." Further, CNET reported that "DeepScale's approach to autonomy fits the bigger picture that [Tesla CEO Elon] Musk has promoted for a few years now. Rather than relying on LiDAR, Musk has consistently believed cameras, radar and ultrasonic sensors will make up a robust system without other hardware."
