= SqueezeNet =

Deep neural network for image classification, released 2016

- Original authors: Forrest Iandola, Song Han, Matthew W. Moskewicz, Khalid Ashraf, Bill Dally, Kurt Keutzer
- Release: 22 February 2016; 10 years ago
- Stable release: v1.1 (June 6, 2016; 10 years ago)
- Type: Deep neural network
- License: BSD license
- Repository: github.com/DeepScale/SqueezeNet

SqueezeNet is a deep neural network for image classification released in 2016. SqueezeNet was developed by researchers at DeepScale, University of California, Berkeley, and Stanford University. In designing SqueezeNet, the authors' goal was to create a smaller neural network with fewer parameters while achieving competitive accuracy. Their best-performing model achieved the same accuracy as AlexNet on ImageNet classification, but has a size 510x less than it.

== Version history ==
SqueezeNet was originally released on February 22, 2016. This original version of SqueezeNet was implemented on top of the Caffe deep learning software framework. Shortly thereafter, the open-source research community ported SqueezeNet to a number of other deep learning frameworks. On February 26, 2016, Eddie Bell released a port of SqueezeNet for the Chainer deep learning framework. On March 2, 2016, Guo Haria released a port of SqueezeNet for the Apache MXNet framework. On June 3, 2016, Tammy Yang released a port of SqueezeNet for the Keras framework. In 2017, companies including Baidu, Xilinx, Imagination Technologies, and Synopsys demonstrated SqueezeNet running on low-power processing platforms such as smartphones, FPGAs, and custom processors.

As of 2018, SqueezeNet ships "natively" as part of the source code of a number of deep learning frameworks such as PyTorch, Apache MXNet, and Apple CoreML. In addition, third party developers have created implementations of SqueezeNet that are compatible with frameworks such as TensorFlow. Below is a summary of frameworks that support SqueezeNet.

Framework	SqueezeNet support	Ref.
Apache MXNet	Native	
Apple CoreML	Native	
Caffe2	Native	
Keras	3rd party	
MATLAB Deep Learning Toolbox	Native	
ONNX	Native	
PyTorch	Native	
TensorFlow	3rd party	
Wolfram Mathematica	Native	

== Relationship to other networks ==
=== AlexNet ===
SqueezeNet was originally described in SqueezeNet: AlexNet-level accuracy with 50x fewer parameters and <0.5MB model size. AlexNet is a deep neural network that has 240 MB of parameters, and SqueezeNet has just 5 MB of parameters. This small model size can more easily fit into computer memory and can more easily be transmitted over a computer network. However, it's important to note that SqueezeNet is not a "squeezed version of AlexNet." Rather, SqueezeNet is an entirely different DNN architecture than AlexNet. What SqueezeNet and AlexNet have in common is that both of them achieve approximately the same level of accuracy when evaluated on the ImageNet image classification validation dataset.

=== Model compression ===
Model compression (e.g. quantization and pruning of model parameters) can be applied to a deep neural network after it has been trained. In the SqueezeNet paper, the authors demonstrated that a model compression technique called Deep Compression can be applied to SqueezeNet to further reduce the size of the parameter file from 5 MB to 500 KB. Deep Compression has also been applied to other DNNs, such as AlexNet and VGG.

== Variants ==
Some of the members of the original SqueezeNet team have continued to develop resource-efficient deep neural networks for a variety of applications. A few of these works are noted in the following table. As with the original SqueezeNet model, the open-source research community has ported and adapted these newer "squeeze"-family models for compatibility with multiple deep learning frameworks.

DNN model	Application	Original implementation	Other implementations
SqueezeDet	Object Detection on Images	TensorFlow	Caffe, Keras
SqueezeSeg	Semantic Segmentation of LIDAR	TensorFlow	
SqueezeNext	Image Classification	Caffe	TensorFlow, Keras, PyTorch
SqueezeNAS	Neural Architecture Search for Semantic Segmentation	PyTorch	

In addition, the open-source research community has extended SqueezeNet to other applications, including semantic segmentation of images and style transfer.

== See also ==
- Convolutional neural network
- MobileNet
- EfficientNet
- You Only Look Once
- Edge computing
