= Joshua Weitz =

American biologist

Joshua S. Weitz is an American biologist. He is both a professor of biology and the Clark Leadership Chair in Data Analytics at the University of Maryland. Previously, he was a professor at Georgia Tech, where he was the founding director of the Interdisciplinary Graduate Program in Quantitative Biosciences. In 2017, he was elected a Fellow of the American Association for the Advancement of Science.

== Education ==
He earned his A.B at Princeton University in 1997 and his Ph.D. in physics at Massachusetts Institute of Technology in 2003.

== Research ==
Weitz's interests are the dynamics and structure of complex biology systems. In particular, Joshua Weitz's research focuses on the quantitative evaluation of virus-host interactions. The quantitative edge that he brought to the field is summarized in the award winning book Quantitative Viral Ecology, which won the 2016 Postgraduate Textbook Prize awarded by the Royal Society of Biology.

While in graduate school, he co-authored a widely cited paper, Re-examination of the “3/4-law” of Metabolism, published in the Journal of Theoretical Biology. As a post-doctoral scholar, he published Coevolutionary arms races between bacteria and bacteriophage in the Proceedings of the National Academy of Sciences. His notable more recent publications include Statistical structure of host–phage interactions, PNAS (2011), Ocean viruses and their effects on microbial communities and biogeochemical cycles, F1000 Bio. Rep. (2012), Viral tagging reveals discrete populations in Synechococcus viral genome sequence space, Nature (2014), and An oscillating tragedy of the commons in replicator dynamics with game-environment feedback, PNAS (2016).

== Other Activities ==
Weitz has published poetry, including a book of poems he wrote in college, Between Two Stones. He has also been politically active, writing in the Chronicle for Higher Education about advocating for science, and speaking at the Atlanta March for Science.
