= Ivan Selesnick =

Electrical engineer

Ivan Selesnick is an electrical engineer from the NYU Polytechnic School of Engineering in Brooklyn, New York. He was named a Fellow of the Institute of Electrical and Electronics Engineers (IEEE) in 2016 for his contributions to wavelet and sparsity based signal processing.

== Education ==
- BS, MEE, and PhD degrees in Electrical Engineering in 1990, 1991, and 1996 from Rice University, Houston, Texas.
