= Saint Anthony Falls Laboratory =

Coordinates: 44°58′57″N 93°15′18″W

- U.S. Historic district – Contributing property
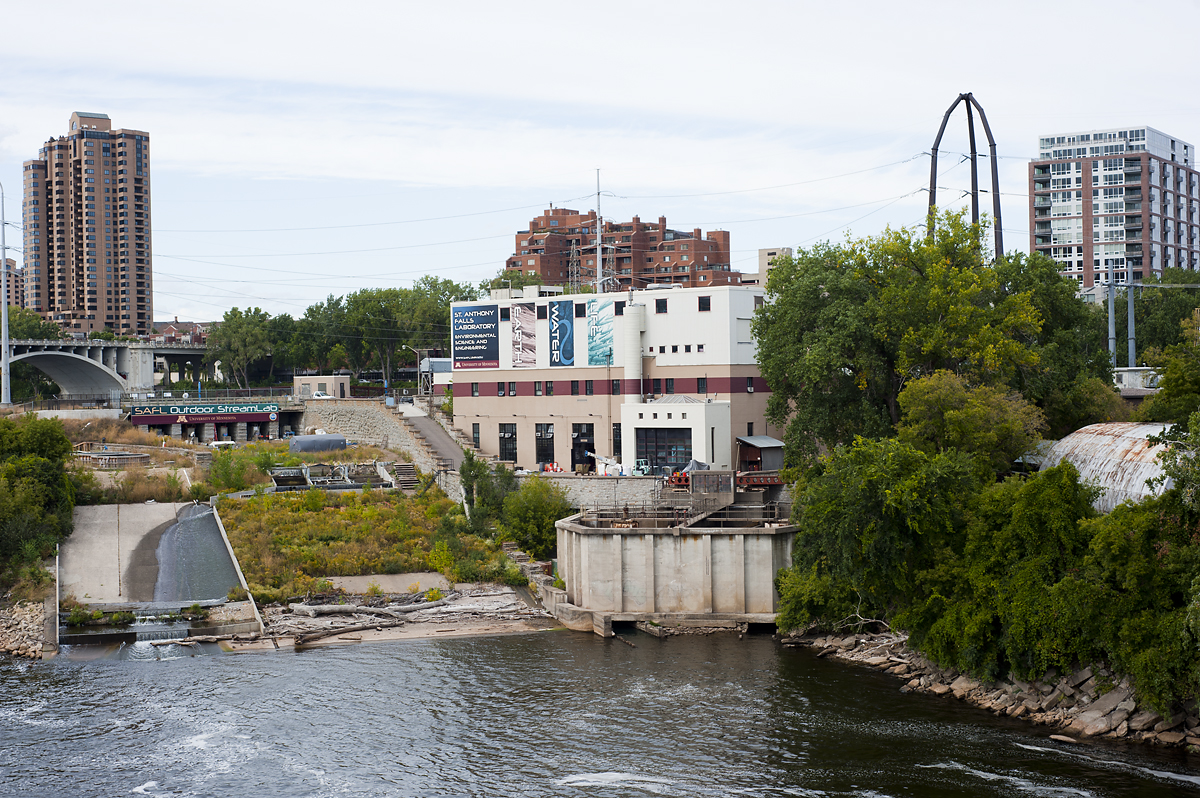
- A view of the Lab in downtown Minneapolis by the Saint Anthony Falls. The laboratory is located on Hennepin Island. Hidden to its right is the hydro-power plant operated by Xcel Energy. To its left is the Outdoor StreamLab field-scale research facility.
- Location: Minneapolis, Minnesota
- Built: 1938
- Engineer: Lorenz G. Straub
- Part of: St. Anthony Falls Historic District (ID71000438)

The Saint Anthony Falls Laboratory (former name: Saint Anthony Falls Hydraulic Laboratory), or SAFL, is a research laboratory situated on Hennepin Island in the Mississippi River in Minneapolis, Minnesota, United States. Its primary research is in "Engineering, Environmental, Biological, and Geophysical Fluid Mechanics". It is affiliated with the University of Minnesota's College of Science and Engineering. Research is conducted by graduate students and faculty alike using the 16,000 square feet of research space and 24 different specialized facilities.

The laboratory is next to Saint Anthony Falls, which allows it to use the hydraulic head from the waterfall to provide water for many of the experiments.

The experiments performed at the laboratory are varied, and may include:

- Contract civil and environmental engineering work, such as dam construction and removal
- Understanding river system dynamics.
- Work with oil exploration to characterize deposits in deltaic systems.
- Work to understand the interactions between fluid flow and the ecology of rivers.
- Work to understand cavitation in fluids in order to build better propellers.

The Saint Anthony Falls Laboratory is also the headquarters of the National Center for Earth-surface Dynamics, a National Science Foundation Science and Technology Center.

The laboratory is a contributing resource of the Saint Anthony Falls Historic District, which is listed on the National Register of Historic Places.

== History ==
SAFL was designed and built in the 1930s with funding provided by the Works Progress Administration and was headed by Lorenz G. Straub until his death in 1963. Construction began in March, 1936 and the Lab was opened and dedicated in November, 1938.

At first, SAFL focused on hydraulic and engineering research, but after Straub's death the Lab began to expand its research to broader focuses such as stratified flows, turbulence and hydrology. An atmospheric layer wind tunnel and multiple flumes were also added to the collection of research facilities. This was made possible through funding from the National Science Foundation (NSF).

From 1977 through 1993, the Laboratory emphasized the integration of education and basic and applied research. Several new faculty were appointed to bring new research efforts to SAFL like computational fluid dynamics, water resources and energy, environmental water research, naval hydrodynamics, cavitation, wind engineering, small hydropower development, rainfall modeling, and geomorphology to name a few. The NSF made SAFL the headquarters of the National Center of Earth-Surface Dynamics (NCED) in 2002, a center devoted to greater predictive earth surface technology and research.

In 2006, the University of Minnesota and St. Anthony Falls Laboratory implemented a wind-energy research consortium, called EOLOS, which brought together academic partners, industry, and government laboratories with help of a grant from the Department of Energy. This new facility located just south of Minneapolis focused on renewable energy research.

Since then, SAFL has become a center for the study of earth surface and fluid dynamics. Multiple new facilities have been added over the years to expand research capabilities and many have been created by the staff and are exclusively used by SAFL researchers.

Funding for SAFL's expansions has come throughout the years from a number of outside sources like NASA, NSF, U.S. Navy, Department of Energy, Air Force Office of Scientific Research, Hamburg Ship Model Basin, the Legislative-Citizen Commission for Minnesota Resources, and many more.

The St. Anthony Falls Laboratory was added as a research facility to the University of Minnesota's College of Science and Engineering in 2011.

== Research programs ==
Research at SAFL includes the work of many fields, including civil engineering, hydraulic engineering, hydrology, ecology, and geology. Research at SAFL has been spurred on in the first decade of the 21st century by its status as the headquarters of the National Center for Earth-surface Dynamics (NCED)

Analog material models of fluvial and depositional systems are employed by geologists at SAFL to understand the causes of river channel morphologies and dynamics, as well as to reconstruct the history of events that produces particular stratigraphic packages. Researchers working on channel morphology have shown the importance of vegetation in restricting braided channels to a single thread (and often sinuous) system. Research done on experimental alluvial fan deltas has highlighted the statistics of flow occupation and their potential hazard to life and property, shown autogenic cyclicity in patterns of sediment storage and release that determine short-term shoreline positions, and has been connected to sequence stratigraphy and the processes that form the stratigraphic record.

Research at SAFL is primarily concentrated in four major areas:

- Earth surface, water, and life
- Mitigating impacts of global environmental change
- Renewable energy systems
- Biomedical fluid mechanics for personalized health care

=== Earth surface, water, and life research ===
SAFL became involved with NCED in 2002, an NSF Science and Technology center that focuses on developing an integrated, quantitative approach to predicting the evolution of Earth's surface. It concentrates on a full range of critical disciplines such as engineering, Earth science, biology, mathematics, physics, and social sciences. Now SAFL is a part of NCED2, a grant that supports the continuation of the research synthesis postdoctoral and outreach programs created by NCED.

At present, SAFL's Earth surface research revolves around the following interlinked themes:

- Multi-scale virtual aquatic environments
- Interplay of fluid flow, microorganism physiology, and biogeochemistry
- Particles, bubbles, and other multi-phase flows
- Deltas and depositional systems
- River networks as corridors of environmental change

SAFL's long-term research vision is to "develop an interconnected system of theoretical and computational models, supported by data streams from the living surface environment, that can provide testable, adaptive predictions for scenarios ranging from environmental restoration and natural hazard mitigation to changes in precipitation to global sea-level rise."

=== Global environmental change research ===
SAFL has active research programs in a number of areas to assess and quantify global change impacts and to develop science-based solutions for mitigating their consequences such as an altered atmosphere and a degradation of water resources.

SAFL research areas include:

- Earth observations from space for assessing global environmental change
- Debris flow hazards
- River flooding
- Air quality
- Water quality and habitat

"Mitigating the impacts of global environmental change will be at the forefront of scientific research for many decades to come. SAFL is positioned to help create real and measurable impacts through catalyzing large-scale interdisciplinary research, integrating engineering with social, behavioral, and economic sciences, leveraging big data and data-driven science, exploiting exponentially growing computational capacity, and actively engaging stakeholders, policy makers, and communities."

=== Renewable energy research ===
Since 2007 SAFL has developed new experimental facilities at laboratory and field scales, advanced computational tools, and new partnerships with industry and government laboratories to position itself for more capable research in fluid mechanics and renewable energy systems. This research focus aims to use research and technology to combat and study the effects of climate change such as more frequent extreme weather phenomena, and sea level rise.

SAFL research in this field includes:

- Wind energy
- Water power (including hydropower and marine and hydrokinetic technologies)
- Biofuel production from microscopic algae.

"The most economically feasible strategies for significantly reducing global carbon emissions involve substantial increases in energy production from renewable resources, which presently contribute only 10-13% in the world’s energy portfolio... Renewable energy technologies based on wind energy, marine hydrokinetic energy, and biofuel energy are integral parts of the living Earth-surface environment. The implementation of these technologies should be supported by mechanistic models, which are driven by real-time data, and should be integrated with policy, economics, human health sciences, and ecology. SAFL can provide national leadership on all of these fronts, working with a mindset to actively engage industry, government and state agencies, and other renewable energy stakeholders."

=== Biomedical fluid mechanics research ===
The coupling between fluid mechanics and biology has led to growth in recent years of research aimed at understanding the fluid mechanics of the human body and quantifying their linkages with disease pathways.

SAFL is a leader in cardiovascular fluid mechanics research using a simulation-based research approach. Novel computational hemodynamics tools have been developed, validated, and applied to study a wide range of clinically relevant problems. Partnerships have been established and leveraged within the UMN with the Department of Biomedical Engineering, the Department of Aerospace Engineering and Mechanics, the Medical School, and the Institute for Engineering in Medicine, as well as with the Mayo Clinic and other collaborators around the country.

Research themes include:

- Cardiovascular fluid mechanics research
- Respiratory fluid mechanics research

The guiding task for biomedical fluid mechanics research in the coming years is the integration of computational tools from the academic research arena to clinical practice, supporting the rapidly emerging future of personalized health care.

== Research facilities and engineering services ==
The St. Anthony Falls Laboratory is a 16,000 square foot research facility on the Mississippi River. The Lab has 15 general purpose flumes, tanks, and channels that are readily configurable to the needs of a project and can indefinitely pump in water from the Mississippi at up to 300 ft³/s. Facilities at SAFL include the main channel, through which Mississippi River water can be sent for large-scale sediment transport experiments; the delta basins, designed to quickly build experimental stratigraphy; the eXperimental EarthScape facility (XES, nicknamed "Jurassic Tank"), a subsiding basin for large-scale depositional modeling; the Outdoor Stream Lab, which is used to understand fluvial processes and riparian ecology at closer to a field scale; and many other pieces of equipment. The lab is known for rapidly constructing and destructing experimental apparatuses, including full-scale models of rivers to understand the effects of dam removal.

=== Engineering services ===
SAFL’s Applied Research & Engineering team expertise ranges from hydraulics, to aerospace engineering, to welding, to data collection systems. The team provides a number of services including research, product testing, and fabrication.

=== Main channel ===
The main channel is SAFL's largest research channel, measuring 275 feet in length, is a straight, concrete channel that has the capability of a 300 ft³/s flow rate of water from the Mississippi River that can be run as a pond system or a flow-through system. The channel is equipped with a wave generator, sediment flux monitoring and recirculation system, and a data acquisition carriage.

=== EXperimental EarthScape (nicknamed "Jurassic Tank" or XES) ===
This specialized basin is used to study delta and basin morphodynamics on geologic time scales. This basin is unique to SAFL because of its design and capabilities: it can incorporate the effects of tectonism on surface processes by simulating subsidence in the basin floor and its data carriage allows data collection over the entire XES basin and assists in "slicing" for more visible cross-sections. The XES basin is home to SAFL's most advanced data carriage.

=== Delta basins ===
These two rectangular basins part of SAFL research on deltas and deltaic systems. The basins allow control of water surface, sediment feed, and water feed rates. Data acquisition includes a new SAFL-designed data carriage, topographic scanner, and various camera systems. Both basins are 16.4 x 16.4 feet and are 2.1 feet deep.

=== Outdoor StreamLab ===
Located outside of the SAFL building, this uniquely designed outdoor field-scale facility was developed by SAFL and NCED and can be used to conduct larger experiments under controlled conditions. It is capable of creating floods and has a large range of flow rates for hydrological, ecological and biological research. the OSL allows for a range of water flow rates, sediment feed rates, a meandering river bend, channel formation, and flooding capabilities. This is used to facilitate a variety of floodplain, vegetation, and channel research opportunities. The StreamLab has a recirculating water outflow of up to a 200 L³/s.

=== Wind tunnel ===
Designed for modeling of the air/land boundary layer, the wind tunnel can provide a circulating or once-through flow of air that can reach up to 148 ft/s. It is equipped with a glass observation wall, temperature and surface variation capabilities, a rotating turntable, smoke generator, and laser instrumentation. The tunnel has temperature control capabilities that allow for study effects of thermal stratification in atmosphere on structures.

=== CloudIA ===
CloudIA is a SAFL-created facility that is composed of 256 individually controlled air jets that can generate 1 m³ of air turbulence. It is designed to replicate conditions found in the atmosphere to study particle

behavior on a smaller scale. Liquid or solid micro-particles can be dropped in at adjustable rates and are tracked by multiple high-speed cameras and a high-repetition laser. CloudIA is also fully transparent to allow live visibility.

=== EOLOS ===
A wind energy consortium that is partnered with many organizations that range from small companies to government agencies like the U.S. Department of Energy. Ongoing research projects deal with wind farm siting, condition-based monitoring, control system optimization, aeroelastic modeling, drag and noise reduction methods, radar interactions with wind farms, power electronics, and gear boxes.

=== Other research facilities ===
SAFL also has a number of other specialized research facilities that include multiple flumes, channels, tanks and basins of varying shapes and sizes depending on the research project.

== Education and outreach ==
=== Public lectures ===
During the academic year, SAFL hosts biweekly seminars on various topics related to environmental, geophysical and biological fluid mechanics and engineering featuring presenters from academia, government agencies and industry. These seminars are free and open to the public.

=== Tours ===
SAFL hosts both public and private facility tours. During the summer, public tours are listed on the University of Minnesota's Events Calendar with registration information. Private tours can be requested for groups of 6 or more on SAFL's tour website. Private tours are prioritized for educational or professional groups with connections to SAFL research.

=== Research Experience for Undergraduates (REU) ===
The REU program is a collaboration among the University of Minnesota, the Fond du Lac Band of the Lake Superior Chippewa, and the Confederated Salish and Kootenai tribes in Montana to study various research topics that can help problems in the community. Topics can concentrate on Earth-surface dynamics, geology, civil and environmental engineering, ecology, biology, hydrology, etc.
